

468001–468100 

|-bgcolor=#C2FFFF
| 468001 ||  || — || April 7, 2005 || Mount Lemmon || Mount Lemmon Survey || L4 || align=right | 13 km || 
|-id=002 bgcolor=#E9E9E9
| 468002 ||  || — || April 24, 2007 || Mount Lemmon || Mount Lemmon Survey || — || align=right | 1.7 km || 
|-id=003 bgcolor=#d6d6d6
| 468003 ||  || — || April 13, 2010 || Mount Lemmon || Mount Lemmon Survey || — || align=right | 2.9 km || 
|-id=004 bgcolor=#FFC2E0
| 468004 ||  || — || December 5, 2012 || Mount Lemmon || Mount Lemmon Survey || AMOcritical || align=right data-sort-value="0.49" | 490 m || 
|-id=005 bgcolor=#FFC2E0
| 468005 ||  || — || December 10, 2012 || Kitt Peak || Spacewatch || APOPHA || align=right data-sort-value="0.21" | 210 m || 
|-id=006 bgcolor=#d6d6d6
| 468006 ||  || — || June 25, 2010 || WISE || WISE || TIR || align=right | 3.2 km || 
|-id=007 bgcolor=#fefefe
| 468007 || 2013 AR || — || November 4, 2004 || Catalina || CSS || H || align=right data-sort-value="0.70" | 700 m || 
|-id=008 bgcolor=#fefefe
| 468008 ||  || — || January 13, 2005 || Catalina || CSS || H || align=right data-sort-value="0.65" | 650 m || 
|-id=009 bgcolor=#C2FFFF
| 468009 ||  || — || September 22, 2009 || Kitt Peak || Spacewatch || L4 || align=right | 7.2 km || 
|-id=010 bgcolor=#fefefe
| 468010 ||  || — || March 11, 2008 || Catalina || CSS || H || align=right data-sort-value="0.77" | 770 m || 
|-id=011 bgcolor=#C2FFFF
| 468011 ||  || — || December 21, 2012 || Mount Lemmon || Mount Lemmon Survey || L4 || align=right | 10 km || 
|-id=012 bgcolor=#C2FFFF
| 468012 ||  || — || January 13, 2013 || Mount Lemmon || Mount Lemmon Survey || L4 || align=right | 6.5 km || 
|-id=013 bgcolor=#C2FFFF
| 468013 ||  || — || September 17, 2009 || Kitt Peak || Spacewatch || L4 || align=right | 7.8 km || 
|-id=014 bgcolor=#C2FFFF
| 468014 ||  || — || October 17, 2010 || Mount Lemmon || Mount Lemmon Survey || L4 || align=right | 8.6 km || 
|-id=015 bgcolor=#C2FFFF
| 468015 ||  || — || October 12, 2010 || Mount Lemmon || Mount Lemmon Survey || L4 || align=right | 7.8 km || 
|-id=016 bgcolor=#C2FFFF
| 468016 ||  || — || November 30, 2010 || Mount Lemmon || Mount Lemmon Survey || L4 || align=right | 8.4 km || 
|-id=017 bgcolor=#fefefe
| 468017 ||  || — || February 9, 2008 || Mount Lemmon || Mount Lemmon Survey || H || align=right data-sort-value="0.80" | 800 m || 
|-id=018 bgcolor=#fefefe
| 468018 ||  || — || August 29, 2006 || Kitt Peak || Spacewatch || H || align=right data-sort-value="0.53" | 530 m || 
|-id=019 bgcolor=#fefefe
| 468019 ||  || — || September 19, 2006 || Catalina || CSS || H || align=right data-sort-value="0.68" | 680 m || 
|-id=020 bgcolor=#fefefe
| 468020 ||  || — || December 14, 2006 || Mount Lemmon || Mount Lemmon Survey || H || align=right data-sort-value="0.72" | 720 m || 
|-id=021 bgcolor=#fefefe
| 468021 ||  || — || September 19, 2006 || Catalina || CSS || H || align=right data-sort-value="0.56" | 560 m || 
|-id=022 bgcolor=#fefefe
| 468022 ||  || — || February 14, 2010 || Mount Lemmon || Mount Lemmon Survey || H || align=right data-sort-value="0.71" | 710 m || 
|-id=023 bgcolor=#E9E9E9
| 468023 ||  || — || June 13, 2005 || Mount Lemmon || Mount Lemmon Survey || — || align=right | 1.4 km || 
|-id=024 bgcolor=#fefefe
| 468024 ||  || — || July 3, 2003 || Kitt Peak || Spacewatch || — || align=right data-sort-value="0.62" | 620 m || 
|-id=025 bgcolor=#FA8072
| 468025 ||  || — || January 10, 2008 || Mount Lemmon || Mount Lemmon Survey || — || align=right data-sort-value="0.92" | 920 m || 
|-id=026 bgcolor=#fefefe
| 468026 ||  || — || July 18, 2010 || WISE || WISE || — || align=right data-sort-value="0.56" | 560 m || 
|-id=027 bgcolor=#fefefe
| 468027 ||  || — || November 10, 2010 || Kitt Peak || Spacewatch || — || align=right data-sort-value="0.78" | 780 m || 
|-id=028 bgcolor=#fefefe
| 468028 ||  || — || November 1, 2010 || Mount Lemmon || Mount Lemmon Survey || V || align=right data-sort-value="0.60" | 600 m || 
|-id=029 bgcolor=#fefefe
| 468029 ||  || — || September 19, 2006 || Catalina || CSS || — || align=right data-sort-value="0.71" | 710 m || 
|-id=030 bgcolor=#fefefe
| 468030 ||  || — || August 9, 2013 || Kitt Peak || Spacewatch || V || align=right data-sort-value="0.77" | 770 m || 
|-id=031 bgcolor=#fefefe
| 468031 ||  || — || July 4, 2005 || Mount Lemmon || Mount Lemmon Survey || — || align=right data-sort-value="0.77" | 770 m || 
|-id=032 bgcolor=#fefefe
| 468032 ||  || — || March 16, 2012 || Mount Lemmon || Mount Lemmon Survey || NYS || align=right data-sort-value="0.53" | 530 m || 
|-id=033 bgcolor=#E9E9E9
| 468033 ||  || — || November 25, 2009 || Kitt Peak || Spacewatch || — || align=right | 2.6 km || 
|-id=034 bgcolor=#d6d6d6
| 468034 ||  || — || February 12, 2004 || Kitt Peak || Spacewatch || LIX || align=right | 3.7 km || 
|-id=035 bgcolor=#fefefe
| 468035 ||  || — || September 6, 1996 || Kitt Peak || Spacewatch || critical || align=right data-sort-value="0.52" | 520 m || 
|-id=036 bgcolor=#fefefe
| 468036 ||  || — || November 3, 2010 || Mount Lemmon || Mount Lemmon Survey || — || align=right data-sort-value="0.59" | 590 m || 
|-id=037 bgcolor=#fefefe
| 468037 ||  || — || April 4, 2008 || Mount Lemmon || Mount Lemmon Survey || — || align=right | 1.0 km || 
|-id=038 bgcolor=#fefefe
| 468038 ||  || — || March 11, 2008 || Kitt Peak || Spacewatch || — || align=right data-sort-value="0.91" | 910 m || 
|-id=039 bgcolor=#fefefe
| 468039 ||  || — || March 1, 2012 || Mount Lemmon || Mount Lemmon Survey || — || align=right data-sort-value="0.80" | 800 m || 
|-id=040 bgcolor=#fefefe
| 468040 ||  || — || July 30, 2013 || Kitt Peak || Spacewatch || — || align=right data-sort-value="0.67" | 670 m || 
|-id=041 bgcolor=#fefefe
| 468041 ||  || — || October 10, 1999 || Kitt Peak || Spacewatch || — || align=right data-sort-value="0.71" | 710 m || 
|-id=042 bgcolor=#E9E9E9
| 468042 ||  || — || February 23, 2007 || Mount Lemmon || Mount Lemmon Survey || — || align=right | 1.5 km || 
|-id=043 bgcolor=#fefefe
| 468043 ||  || — || April 2, 2009 || Kitt Peak || Spacewatch || — || align=right data-sort-value="0.59" | 590 m || 
|-id=044 bgcolor=#fefefe
| 468044 ||  || — || July 20, 1998 || Caussols || ODAS || — || align=right data-sort-value="0.70" | 700 m || 
|-id=045 bgcolor=#FA8072
| 468045 ||  || — || November 6, 2010 || Mount Lemmon || Mount Lemmon Survey || — || align=right data-sort-value="0.65" | 650 m || 
|-id=046 bgcolor=#fefefe
| 468046 ||  || — || March 17, 2012 || Mount Lemmon || Mount Lemmon Survey || — || align=right data-sort-value="0.69" | 690 m || 
|-id=047 bgcolor=#fefefe
| 468047 ||  || — || February 13, 2008 || Mount Lemmon || Mount Lemmon Survey || — || align=right data-sort-value="0.77" | 770 m || 
|-id=048 bgcolor=#fefefe
| 468048 ||  || — || October 27, 2006 || Kitt Peak || Spacewatch || — || align=right data-sort-value="0.90" | 900 m || 
|-id=049 bgcolor=#E9E9E9
| 468049 ||  || — || March 30, 2011 || Mount Lemmon || Mount Lemmon Survey || — || align=right | 2.1 km || 
|-id=050 bgcolor=#fefefe
| 468050 ||  || — || March 29, 2008 || Mount Lemmon || Mount Lemmon Survey || — || align=right data-sort-value="0.99" | 990 m || 
|-id=051 bgcolor=#E9E9E9
| 468051 ||  || — || January 6, 2010 || Kitt Peak || Spacewatch || — || align=right | 3.5 km || 
|-id=052 bgcolor=#fefefe
| 468052 ||  || — || November 3, 1999 || Kitt Peak || Spacewatch || — || align=right data-sort-value="0.67" | 670 m || 
|-id=053 bgcolor=#E9E9E9
| 468053 ||  || — || October 9, 2004 || Kitt Peak || Spacewatch || — || align=right | 2.6 km || 
|-id=054 bgcolor=#E9E9E9
| 468054 ||  || — || December 7, 2005 || Kitt Peak || Spacewatch ||  || align=right | 1.2 km || 
|-id=055 bgcolor=#E9E9E9
| 468055 ||  || — || October 8, 2004 || Kitt Peak || Spacewatch || AGN || align=right data-sort-value="0.97" | 970 m || 
|-id=056 bgcolor=#fefefe
| 468056 ||  || — || April 16, 2005 || Kitt Peak || Spacewatch || NYS || align=right data-sort-value="0.52" | 520 m || 
|-id=057 bgcolor=#E9E9E9
| 468057 ||  || — || November 16, 2009 || Mount Lemmon || Mount Lemmon Survey || — || align=right | 2.0 km || 
|-id=058 bgcolor=#fefefe
| 468058 ||  || — || November 17, 2006 || Mount Lemmon || Mount Lemmon Survey || — || align=right data-sort-value="0.70" | 700 m || 
|-id=059 bgcolor=#fefefe
| 468059 ||  || — || September 19, 1995 || Kitt Peak || Spacewatch || — || align=right data-sort-value="0.46" | 460 m || 
|-id=060 bgcolor=#fefefe
| 468060 ||  || — || March 28, 2012 || Kitt Peak || Spacewatch || — || align=right data-sort-value="0.84" | 840 m || 
|-id=061 bgcolor=#fefefe
| 468061 ||  || — || March 24, 2012 || Mount Lemmon || Mount Lemmon Survey || — || align=right data-sort-value="0.72" | 720 m || 
|-id=062 bgcolor=#d6d6d6
| 468062 ||  || — || February 9, 2010 || Kitt Peak || Spacewatch || — || align=right | 2.7 km || 
|-id=063 bgcolor=#fefefe
| 468063 ||  || — || May 8, 2005 || Mount Lemmon || Mount Lemmon Survey || MAS || align=right data-sort-value="0.75" | 750 m || 
|-id=064 bgcolor=#fefefe
| 468064 ||  || — || November 20, 2006 || Kitt Peak || Spacewatch || — || align=right data-sort-value="0.68" | 680 m || 
|-id=065 bgcolor=#fefefe
| 468065 ||  || — || July 28, 2009 || Catalina || CSS || MAS || align=right data-sort-value="0.78" | 780 m || 
|-id=066 bgcolor=#fefefe
| 468066 ||  || — || September 19, 2006 || Catalina || CSS || — || align=right data-sort-value="0.65" | 650 m || 
|-id=067 bgcolor=#E9E9E9
| 468067 ||  || — || December 5, 2005 || Kitt Peak || Spacewatch || (5) || align=right data-sort-value="0.73" | 730 m || 
|-id=068 bgcolor=#fefefe
| 468068 ||  || — || July 4, 2005 || Kitt Peak || Spacewatch || — || align=right data-sort-value="0.75" | 750 m || 
|-id=069 bgcolor=#d6d6d6
| 468069 ||  || — || March 2, 2011 || Kitt Peak || Spacewatch || — || align=right | 3.6 km || 
|-id=070 bgcolor=#fefefe
| 468070 ||  || — || March 13, 2012 || Mount Lemmon || Mount Lemmon Survey || NYS || align=right data-sort-value="0.64" | 640 m || 
|-id=071 bgcolor=#fefefe
| 468071 ||  || — || April 10, 2005 || Mount Lemmon || Mount Lemmon Survey || — || align=right data-sort-value="0.73" | 730 m || 
|-id=072 bgcolor=#E9E9E9
| 468072 ||  || — || October 1, 2005 || Mount Lemmon || Mount Lemmon Survey || — || align=right data-sort-value="0.72" | 720 m || 
|-id=073 bgcolor=#E9E9E9
| 468073 ||  || — || September 20, 2009 || Mount Lemmon || Mount Lemmon Survey || EUN || align=right | 1.4 km || 
|-id=074 bgcolor=#fefefe
| 468074 ||  || — || August 2, 2009 || Siding Spring || SSS || — || align=right data-sort-value="0.91" | 910 m || 
|-id=075 bgcolor=#fefefe
| 468075 ||  || — || September 28, 2006 || Mount Lemmon || Mount Lemmon Survey || MAS || align=right data-sort-value="0.66" | 660 m || 
|-id=076 bgcolor=#E9E9E9
| 468076 ||  || — || September 29, 2009 || Mount Lemmon || Mount Lemmon Survey || EUN || align=right | 1.7 km || 
|-id=077 bgcolor=#fefefe
| 468077 ||  || — || November 10, 2006 || Kitt Peak || Spacewatch || — || align=right data-sort-value="0.75" | 750 m || 
|-id=078 bgcolor=#fefefe
| 468078 ||  || — || June 23, 2009 || Mount Lemmon || Mount Lemmon Survey || MAS || align=right data-sort-value="0.71" | 710 m || 
|-id=079 bgcolor=#d6d6d6
| 468079 ||  || — || November 9, 2008 || Kitt Peak || Spacewatch || EOS || align=right | 1.7 km || 
|-id=080 bgcolor=#E9E9E9
| 468080 ||  || — || March 29, 2011 || Mount Lemmon || Mount Lemmon Survey || — || align=right | 1.9 km || 
|-id=081 bgcolor=#fefefe
| 468081 ||  || — || August 19, 2009 || Kitt Peak || Spacewatch || — || align=right data-sort-value="0.72" | 720 m || 
|-id=082 bgcolor=#fefefe
| 468082 ||  || — || June 17, 2009 || Kitt Peak || Spacewatch || — || align=right data-sort-value="0.68" | 680 m || 
|-id=083 bgcolor=#E9E9E9
| 468083 ||  || — || October 4, 2013 || Mount Lemmon || Mount Lemmon Survey || — || align=right | 2.4 km || 
|-id=084 bgcolor=#E9E9E9
| 468084 ||  || — || October 28, 2005 || Kitt Peak || Spacewatch || — || align=right | 2.5 km || 
|-id=085 bgcolor=#E9E9E9
| 468085 ||  || — || May 5, 2008 || Mount Lemmon || Mount Lemmon Survey || — || align=right data-sort-value="0.98" | 980 m || 
|-id=086 bgcolor=#fefefe
| 468086 ||  || — || October 21, 2006 || Kitt Peak || Spacewatch || — || align=right data-sort-value="0.67" | 670 m || 
|-id=087 bgcolor=#d6d6d6
| 468087 ||  || — || March 15, 2010 || Mount Lemmon || Mount Lemmon Survey || — || align=right | 2.4 km || 
|-id=088 bgcolor=#d6d6d6
| 468088 ||  || — || October 2, 2013 || Kitt Peak || Spacewatch || — || align=right | 3.7 km || 
|-id=089 bgcolor=#d6d6d6
| 468089 ||  || — || October 3, 2013 || Kitt Peak || Spacewatch || — || align=right | 2.8 km || 
|-id=090 bgcolor=#E9E9E9
| 468090 ||  || — || September 26, 2000 || Socorro || LINEAR || — || align=right | 1.5 km || 
|-id=091 bgcolor=#fefefe
| 468091 ||  || — || September 13, 2013 || Mount Lemmon || Mount Lemmon Survey || — || align=right data-sort-value="0.72" | 720 m || 
|-id=092 bgcolor=#d6d6d6
| 468092 ||  || — || November 21, 2008 || Kitt Peak || Spacewatch || — || align=right | 3.1 km || 
|-id=093 bgcolor=#d6d6d6
| 468093 ||  || — || April 24, 2011 || Mount Lemmon || Mount Lemmon Survey || EOS || align=right | 1.5 km || 
|-id=094 bgcolor=#fefefe
| 468094 ||  || — || August 17, 2009 || Siding Spring || SSS || — || align=right | 1.0 km || 
|-id=095 bgcolor=#d6d6d6
| 468095 ||  || — || July 13, 2010 || WISE || WISE || — || align=right | 3.7 km || 
|-id=096 bgcolor=#d6d6d6
| 468096 ||  || — || November 19, 2008 || Kitt Peak || Spacewatch || — || align=right | 3.7 km || 
|-id=097 bgcolor=#E9E9E9
| 468097 ||  || — || January 27, 2006 || Kitt Peak || Spacewatch || — || align=right | 1.8 km || 
|-id=098 bgcolor=#E9E9E9
| 468098 ||  || — || September 20, 2009 || Mount Lemmon || Mount Lemmon Survey || — || align=right | 1.0 km || 
|-id=099 bgcolor=#fefefe
| 468099 ||  || — || September 16, 2009 || Catalina || CSS || — || align=right data-sort-value="0.88" | 880 m || 
|-id=100 bgcolor=#E9E9E9
| 468100 ||  || — || January 7, 2010 || Kitt Peak || Spacewatch || — || align=right | 2.7 km || 
|}

468101–468200 

|-bgcolor=#E9E9E9
| 468101 ||  || — || January 27, 2006 || Kitt Peak || Spacewatch || — || align=right | 1.9 km || 
|-id=102 bgcolor=#d6d6d6
| 468102 ||  || — || October 12, 2007 || Catalina || CSS || — || align=right | 4.0 km || 
|-id=103 bgcolor=#E9E9E9
| 468103 ||  || — || March 12, 2011 || Mount Lemmon || Mount Lemmon Survey || — || align=right | 1.7 km || 
|-id=104 bgcolor=#d6d6d6
| 468104 ||  || — || March 17, 2004 || Kitt Peak || Spacewatch || — || align=right | 2.6 km || 
|-id=105 bgcolor=#fefefe
| 468105 ||  || — || October 26, 2000 || Kitt Peak || Spacewatch || H || align=right data-sort-value="0.76" | 760 m || 
|-id=106 bgcolor=#d6d6d6
| 468106 ||  || — || November 1, 2008 || Kitt Peak || Spacewatch || — || align=right | 3.0 km || 
|-id=107 bgcolor=#d6d6d6
| 468107 ||  || — || August 10, 2007 || Kitt Peak || Spacewatch || — || align=right | 2.4 km || 
|-id=108 bgcolor=#d6d6d6
| 468108 ||  || — || November 2, 2013 || Mount Lemmon || Mount Lemmon Survey || — || align=right | 3.2 km || 
|-id=109 bgcolor=#d6d6d6
| 468109 ||  || — || October 26, 2013 || Kitt Peak || Spacewatch || EOS || align=right | 1.9 km || 
|-id=110 bgcolor=#d6d6d6
| 468110 ||  || — || November 8, 2007 || Socorro || LINEAR || — || align=right | 4.2 km || 
|-id=111 bgcolor=#d6d6d6
| 468111 ||  || — || November 28, 2013 || Kitt Peak || Spacewatch || — || align=right | 3.6 km || 
|-id=112 bgcolor=#E9E9E9
| 468112 ||  || — || April 4, 2011 || Catalina || CSS || — || align=right | 2.7 km || 
|-id=113 bgcolor=#d6d6d6
| 468113 ||  || — || September 22, 2012 || Mount Lemmon || Mount Lemmon Survey || EOS || align=right | 1.9 km || 
|-id=114 bgcolor=#E9E9E9
| 468114 ||  || — || April 21, 2012 || Mount Lemmon || Mount Lemmon Survey || — || align=right | 1.6 km || 
|-id=115 bgcolor=#d6d6d6
| 468115 ||  || — || February 1, 2010 || WISE || WISE || — || align=right | 3.6 km || 
|-id=116 bgcolor=#d6d6d6
| 468116 ||  || — || May 26, 2006 || Mount Lemmon || Mount Lemmon Survey || — || align=right | 3.5 km || 
|-id=117 bgcolor=#FFC2E0
| 468117 ||  || — || March 1, 2014 || WISE || WISE || APO || align=right data-sort-value="0.49" | 490 m || 
|-id=118 bgcolor=#C2FFFF
| 468118 ||  || — || January 5, 2013 || Kitt Peak || Spacewatch || L4 || align=right | 8.8 km || 
|-id=119 bgcolor=#FA8072
| 468119 ||  || — || May 25, 2011 || Kitt Peak || Spacewatch || H || align=right data-sort-value="0.76" | 760 m || 
|-id=120 bgcolor=#E9E9E9
| 468120 ||  || — || November 5, 2005 || Catalina || CSS || — || align=right | 2.1 km || 
|-id=121 bgcolor=#fefefe
| 468121 ||  || — || May 16, 2013 || Mount Lemmon || Mount Lemmon Survey || — || align=right data-sort-value="0.88" | 880 m || 
|-id=122 bgcolor=#E9E9E9
| 468122 ||  || — || November 8, 2010 || Mount Lemmon || Mount Lemmon Survey || — || align=right | 1.5 km || 
|-id=123 bgcolor=#fefefe
| 468123 ||  || — || October 1, 2006 || Kitt Peak || Spacewatch || — || align=right | 1.1 km || 
|-id=124 bgcolor=#E9E9E9
| 468124 ||  || — || April 15, 2008 || Kitt Peak || Spacewatch || — || align=right | 1.2 km || 
|-id=125 bgcolor=#fefefe
| 468125 ||  || — || October 19, 2006 || Kitt Peak || Spacewatch || H || align=right data-sort-value="0.62" | 620 m || 
|-id=126 bgcolor=#E9E9E9
| 468126 ||  || — || April 18, 2012 || Kitt Peak || Spacewatch || — || align=right | 1.5 km || 
|-id=127 bgcolor=#fefefe
| 468127 ||  || — || January 18, 2008 || Mount Lemmon || Mount Lemmon Survey || — || align=right data-sort-value="0.98" | 980 m || 
|-id=128 bgcolor=#d6d6d6
| 468128 ||  || — || April 12, 2005 || Anderson Mesa || LONEOS || Tj (2.99) || align=right | 2.7 km || 
|-id=129 bgcolor=#fefefe
| 468129 ||  || — || October 7, 2004 || Kitt Peak || Spacewatch || — || align=right data-sort-value="0.61" | 610 m || 
|-id=130 bgcolor=#fefefe
| 468130 ||  || — || October 20, 2007 || Kitt Peak || Spacewatch || V || align=right data-sort-value="0.57" | 570 m || 
|-id=131 bgcolor=#fefefe
| 468131 ||  || — || November 21, 2008 || Kitt Peak || Spacewatch || — || align=right data-sort-value="0.52" | 520 m || 
|-id=132 bgcolor=#fefefe
| 468132 ||  || — || February 3, 2009 || Kitt Peak || Spacewatch || — || align=right data-sort-value="0.62" | 620 m || 
|-id=133 bgcolor=#fefefe
| 468133 ||  || — || October 8, 2004 || Kitt Peak || Spacewatch || — || align=right data-sort-value="0.65" | 650 m || 
|-id=134 bgcolor=#E9E9E9
| 468134 ||  || — || October 24, 2014 || Kitt Peak || Spacewatch || EUN || align=right | 1.0 km || 
|-id=135 bgcolor=#FA8072
| 468135 ||  || — || November 18, 2006 || Mount Lemmon || Mount Lemmon Survey || H || align=right data-sort-value="0.66" | 660 m || 
|-id=136 bgcolor=#fefefe
| 468136 ||  || — || September 28, 2003 || Kitt Peak || Spacewatch || — || align=right data-sort-value="0.61" | 610 m || 
|-id=137 bgcolor=#E9E9E9
| 468137 ||  || — || February 23, 2012 || Mount Lemmon || Mount Lemmon Survey || EUN || align=right | 1.3 km || 
|-id=138 bgcolor=#fefefe
| 468138 ||  || — || December 25, 2011 || Mount Lemmon || Mount Lemmon Survey || NYS || align=right data-sort-value="0.54" | 540 m || 
|-id=139 bgcolor=#fefefe
| 468139 ||  || — || October 17, 1995 || Kitt Peak || Spacewatch || — || align=right data-sort-value="0.75" | 750 m || 
|-id=140 bgcolor=#d6d6d6
| 468140 ||  || — || March 12, 2010 || WISE || WISE || — || align=right | 3.0 km || 
|-id=141 bgcolor=#E9E9E9
| 468141 ||  || — || April 30, 2008 || Mount Lemmon || Mount Lemmon Survey || — || align=right | 1.9 km || 
|-id=142 bgcolor=#E9E9E9
| 468142 ||  || — || November 23, 2006 || Mount Lemmon || Mount Lemmon Survey || — || align=right | 1.0 km || 
|-id=143 bgcolor=#fefefe
| 468143 ||  || — || December 31, 2008 || Kitt Peak || Spacewatch || — || align=right data-sort-value="0.83" | 830 m || 
|-id=144 bgcolor=#fefefe
| 468144 ||  || — || September 4, 2003 || Kitt Peak || Spacewatch || — || align=right data-sort-value="0.81" | 810 m || 
|-id=145 bgcolor=#E9E9E9
| 468145 ||  || — || October 28, 2005 || Mount Lemmon || Mount Lemmon Survey || — || align=right | 1.4 km || 
|-id=146 bgcolor=#d6d6d6
| 468146 ||  || — || March 14, 2011 || Mount Lemmon || Mount Lemmon Survey || EOS || align=right | 2.1 km || 
|-id=147 bgcolor=#fefefe
| 468147 ||  || — || December 4, 2007 || Mount Lemmon || Mount Lemmon Survey || — || align=right data-sort-value="0.78" | 780 m || 
|-id=148 bgcolor=#fefefe
| 468148 ||  || — || November 5, 2007 || Kitt Peak || Spacewatch || V || align=right data-sort-value="0.53" | 530 m || 
|-id=149 bgcolor=#fefefe
| 468149 ||  || — || October 8, 2010 || Kitt Peak || Spacewatch || V || align=right data-sort-value="0.53" | 530 m || 
|-id=150 bgcolor=#fefefe
| 468150 ||  || — || September 18, 2010 || Mount Lemmon || Mount Lemmon Survey || — || align=right data-sort-value="0.70" | 700 m || 
|-id=151 bgcolor=#fefefe
| 468151 ||  || — || February 27, 2012 || Kitt Peak || Spacewatch || — || align=right data-sort-value="0.71" | 710 m || 
|-id=152 bgcolor=#fefefe
| 468152 ||  || — || October 3, 2006 || Mount Lemmon || Mount Lemmon Survey || H || align=right data-sort-value="0.56" | 560 m || 
|-id=153 bgcolor=#E9E9E9
| 468153 ||  || — || December 14, 2010 || Mount Lemmon || Mount Lemmon Survey || — || align=right | 1.2 km || 
|-id=154 bgcolor=#fefefe
| 468154 ||  || — || October 18, 2014 || Kitt Peak || Spacewatch || — || align=right data-sort-value="0.93" | 930 m || 
|-id=155 bgcolor=#fefefe
| 468155 ||  || — || April 21, 1998 || Kitt Peak || Spacewatch || NYS || align=right data-sort-value="0.68" | 680 m || 
|-id=156 bgcolor=#d6d6d6
| 468156 ||  || — || October 28, 2008 || Mount Lemmon || Mount Lemmon Survey || — || align=right | 3.0 km || 
|-id=157 bgcolor=#E9E9E9
| 468157 ||  || — || September 19, 2009 || Kitt Peak || Spacewatch || — || align=right | 2.6 km || 
|-id=158 bgcolor=#E9E9E9
| 468158 ||  || — || January 4, 2011 || Mount Lemmon || Mount Lemmon Survey || JUN || align=right | 1.0 km || 
|-id=159 bgcolor=#fefefe
| 468159 ||  || — || February 24, 2009 || Mount Lemmon || Mount Lemmon Survey || — || align=right data-sort-value="0.98" | 980 m || 
|-id=160 bgcolor=#fefefe
| 468160 ||  || — || October 14, 2001 || Kitt Peak || Spacewatch || — || align=right data-sort-value="0.63" | 630 m || 
|-id=161 bgcolor=#d6d6d6
| 468161 ||  || — || August 10, 2012 || Kitt Peak || Spacewatch || (1118) || align=right | 3.2 km || 
|-id=162 bgcolor=#d6d6d6
| 468162 ||  || — || April 9, 2010 || WISE || WISE || — || align=right | 3.6 km || 
|-id=163 bgcolor=#fefefe
| 468163 ||  || — || March 11, 2005 || Kitt Peak || Spacewatch || — || align=right data-sort-value="0.70" | 700 m || 
|-id=164 bgcolor=#E9E9E9
| 468164 ||  || — || April 14, 2008 || Mount Lemmon || Mount Lemmon Survey || — || align=right | 2.1 km || 
|-id=165 bgcolor=#d6d6d6
| 468165 ||  || — || November 18, 2009 || Mount Lemmon || Mount Lemmon Survey || — || align=right | 2.8 km || 
|-id=166 bgcolor=#fefefe
| 468166 ||  || — || November 18, 2007 || Mount Lemmon || Mount Lemmon Survey || V || align=right data-sort-value="0.57" | 570 m || 
|-id=167 bgcolor=#E9E9E9
| 468167 ||  || — || September 21, 2009 || Mount Lemmon || Mount Lemmon Survey || — || align=right | 2.0 km || 
|-id=168 bgcolor=#fefefe
| 468168 ||  || — || March 1, 2009 || Kitt Peak || Spacewatch || — || align=right data-sort-value="0.70" | 700 m || 
|-id=169 bgcolor=#E9E9E9
| 468169 ||  || — || November 11, 2004 || Socorro || LINEAR || — || align=right | 3.8 km || 
|-id=170 bgcolor=#d6d6d6
| 468170 ||  || — || April 10, 2005 || Kitt Peak || Spacewatch || — || align=right | 3.2 km || 
|-id=171 bgcolor=#E9E9E9
| 468171 ||  || — || March 27, 2011 || Mount Lemmon || Mount Lemmon Survey || — || align=right | 3.4 km || 
|-id=172 bgcolor=#E9E9E9
| 468172 ||  || — || December 3, 2010 || Socorro || LINEAR || — || align=right | 1.4 km || 
|-id=173 bgcolor=#E9E9E9
| 468173 ||  || — || November 28, 2010 || Kitt Peak || Spacewatch || — || align=right | 2.1 km || 
|-id=174 bgcolor=#E9E9E9
| 468174 ||  || — || December 17, 2001 || Socorro || LINEAR || — || align=right | 1.6 km || 
|-id=175 bgcolor=#d6d6d6
| 468175 ||  || — || June 16, 2010 || WISE || WISE || — || align=right | 2.7 km || 
|-id=176 bgcolor=#E9E9E9
| 468176 ||  || — || January 8, 2002 || Socorro || LINEAR || — || align=right | 1.8 km || 
|-id=177 bgcolor=#d6d6d6
| 468177 ||  || — || February 18, 2010 || Kitt Peak || Spacewatch || — || align=right | 2.5 km || 
|-id=178 bgcolor=#d6d6d6
| 468178 ||  || — || January 22, 2004 || Socorro || LINEAR || — || align=right | 3.7 km || 
|-id=179 bgcolor=#fefefe
| 468179 ||  || — || October 15, 2004 || Kitt Peak || Spacewatch || — || align=right data-sort-value="0.69" | 690 m || 
|-id=180 bgcolor=#E9E9E9
| 468180 ||  || — || April 30, 2003 || Kitt Peak || Spacewatch || — || align=right | 1.8 km || 
|-id=181 bgcolor=#d6d6d6
| 468181 ||  || — || April 30, 2011 || Mount Lemmon || Mount Lemmon Survey || — || align=right | 3.6 km || 
|-id=182 bgcolor=#d6d6d6
| 468182 ||  || — || February 27, 2006 || Kitt Peak || Spacewatch || — || align=right | 2.3 km || 
|-id=183 bgcolor=#E9E9E9
| 468183 ||  || — || May 16, 2012 || Mount Lemmon || Mount Lemmon Survey || (5) || align=right data-sort-value="0.84" | 840 m || 
|-id=184 bgcolor=#E9E9E9
| 468184 ||  || — || January 26, 2006 || Kitt Peak || Spacewatch || HOF || align=right | 2.6 km || 
|-id=185 bgcolor=#E9E9E9
| 468185 ||  || — || September 19, 2009 || Mount Lemmon || Mount Lemmon Survey || — || align=right | 1.4 km || 
|-id=186 bgcolor=#d6d6d6
| 468186 ||  || — || February 19, 2010 || Mount Lemmon || Mount Lemmon Survey || — || align=right | 3.4 km || 
|-id=187 bgcolor=#E9E9E9
| 468187 ||  || — || March 14, 2007 || Mount Lemmon || Mount Lemmon Survey || — || align=right | 2.0 km || 
|-id=188 bgcolor=#d6d6d6
| 468188 ||  || — || October 23, 2014 || Mount Lemmon || Mount Lemmon Survey || — || align=right | 3.5 km || 
|-id=189 bgcolor=#fefefe
| 468189 ||  || — || January 29, 2011 || Mount Lemmon || Mount Lemmon Survey || NYS || align=right data-sort-value="0.80" | 800 m || 
|-id=190 bgcolor=#E9E9E9
| 468190 ||  || — || October 30, 2005 || Kitt Peak || Spacewatch || — || align=right data-sort-value="0.93" | 930 m || 
|-id=191 bgcolor=#E9E9E9
| 468191 ||  || — || January 31, 2006 || Kitt Peak || Spacewatch || — || align=right | 2.8 km || 
|-id=192 bgcolor=#d6d6d6
| 468192 ||  || — || May 21, 2011 || Mount Lemmon || Mount Lemmon Survey || EOS || align=right | 2.2 km || 
|-id=193 bgcolor=#d6d6d6
| 468193 ||  || — || April 9, 2010 || WISE || WISE || — || align=right | 2.9 km || 
|-id=194 bgcolor=#E9E9E9
| 468194 ||  || — || January 10, 2011 || Mount Lemmon || Mount Lemmon Survey || — || align=right data-sort-value="0.96" | 960 m || 
|-id=195 bgcolor=#d6d6d6
| 468195 ||  || — || October 25, 2008 || Mount Lemmon || Mount Lemmon Survey || — || align=right | 2.5 km || 
|-id=196 bgcolor=#E9E9E9
| 468196 ||  || — || February 10, 2010 || WISE || WISE || — || align=right | 3.4 km || 
|-id=197 bgcolor=#E9E9E9
| 468197 ||  || — || January 27, 2007 || Kitt Peak || Spacewatch || — || align=right data-sort-value="0.89" | 890 m || 
|-id=198 bgcolor=#d6d6d6
| 468198 ||  || — || January 16, 1999 || Kitt Peak || Spacewatch || — || align=right | 3.2 km || 
|-id=199 bgcolor=#E9E9E9
| 468199 ||  || — || September 11, 2004 || Kitt Peak || Spacewatch || — || align=right | 1.8 km || 
|-id=200 bgcolor=#E9E9E9
| 468200 ||  || — || October 21, 2009 || Mount Lemmon || Mount Lemmon Survey || — || align=right | 2.2 km || 
|}

468201–468300 

|-bgcolor=#d6d6d6
| 468201 ||  || — || February 17, 2004 || Kitt Peak || Spacewatch || — || align=right | 3.2 km || 
|-id=202 bgcolor=#d6d6d6
| 468202 ||  || — || February 16, 2010 || Kitt Peak || Spacewatch || — || align=right | 2.7 km || 
|-id=203 bgcolor=#d6d6d6
| 468203 ||  || — || May 31, 2010 || WISE || WISE || — || align=right | 3.9 km || 
|-id=204 bgcolor=#d6d6d6
| 468204 ||  || — || November 1, 2013 || Mount Lemmon || Mount Lemmon Survey || — || align=right | 2.4 km || 
|-id=205 bgcolor=#E9E9E9
| 468205 ||  || — || February 20, 2006 || Kitt Peak || Spacewatch || — || align=right | 2.0 km || 
|-id=206 bgcolor=#E9E9E9
| 468206 ||  || — || September 28, 2009 || Kitt Peak || Spacewatch || — || align=right | 1.1 km || 
|-id=207 bgcolor=#d6d6d6
| 468207 ||  || — || October 28, 2008 || Mount Lemmon || Mount Lemmon Survey || — || align=right | 2.5 km || 
|-id=208 bgcolor=#fefefe
| 468208 ||  || — || February 10, 2008 || Kitt Peak || Spacewatch || — || align=right data-sort-value="0.91" | 910 m || 
|-id=209 bgcolor=#E9E9E9
| 468209 ||  || — || January 31, 2006 || Kitt Peak || Spacewatch ||  || align=right | 2.4 km || 
|-id=210 bgcolor=#d6d6d6
| 468210 ||  || — || February 19, 2010 || Mount Lemmon || Mount Lemmon Survey || — || align=right | 2.6 km || 
|-id=211 bgcolor=#d6d6d6
| 468211 ||  || — || June 14, 2010 || WISE || WISE || — || align=right | 2.6 km || 
|-id=212 bgcolor=#d6d6d6
| 468212 ||  || — || February 18, 2010 || Mount Lemmon || Mount Lemmon Survey || — || align=right | 3.2 km || 
|-id=213 bgcolor=#d6d6d6
| 468213 ||  || — || April 12, 2005 || Kitt Peak || Spacewatch || — || align=right | 2.8 km || 
|-id=214 bgcolor=#E9E9E9
| 468214 ||  || — || December 22, 2005 || Kitt Peak || Spacewatch || — || align=right | 2.2 km || 
|-id=215 bgcolor=#d6d6d6
| 468215 ||  || — || October 4, 2013 || Mount Lemmon || Mount Lemmon Survey || VER || align=right | 2.4 km || 
|-id=216 bgcolor=#E9E9E9
| 468216 ||  || — || November 17, 2009 || Mount Lemmon || Mount Lemmon Survey || — || align=right | 1.3 km || 
|-id=217 bgcolor=#E9E9E9
| 468217 ||  || — || January 28, 2006 || Kitt Peak || Spacewatch || — || align=right | 2.2 km || 
|-id=218 bgcolor=#d6d6d6
| 468218 ||  || — || October 9, 2008 || Mount Lemmon || Mount Lemmon Survey || — || align=right | 2.4 km || 
|-id=219 bgcolor=#d6d6d6
| 468219 ||  || — || September 23, 2008 || Kitt Peak || Spacewatch || — || align=right | 1.9 km || 
|-id=220 bgcolor=#E9E9E9
| 468220 ||  || — || January 13, 2002 || Socorro || LINEAR || — || align=right | 1.4 km || 
|-id=221 bgcolor=#fefefe
| 468221 ||  || — || December 14, 1998 || Kitt Peak || Spacewatch || — || align=right data-sort-value="0.96" | 960 m || 
|-id=222 bgcolor=#E9E9E9
| 468222 ||  || — || June 15, 2012 || Kitt Peak || Spacewatch || — || align=right | 2.2 km || 
|-id=223 bgcolor=#d6d6d6
| 468223 ||  || — || February 16, 2010 || Mount Lemmon || Mount Lemmon Survey || — || align=right | 2.0 km || 
|-id=224 bgcolor=#d6d6d6
| 468224 ||  || — || September 4, 2008 || Kitt Peak || Spacewatch || — || align=right | 2.2 km || 
|-id=225 bgcolor=#d6d6d6
| 468225 ||  || — || November 7, 2008 || Mount Lemmon || Mount Lemmon Survey || — || align=right | 2.1 km || 
|-id=226 bgcolor=#E9E9E9
| 468226 ||  || — || December 18, 2009 || Kitt Peak || Spacewatch || HOF || align=right | 2.2 km || 
|-id=227 bgcolor=#E9E9E9
| 468227 ||  || — || December 4, 2005 || Kitt Peak || Spacewatch || — || align=right | 2.1 km || 
|-id=228 bgcolor=#fefefe
| 468228 ||  || — || September 14, 2006 || Catalina || CSS || NYS || align=right data-sort-value="0.60" | 600 m || 
|-id=229 bgcolor=#d6d6d6
| 468229 ||  || — || August 10, 2007 || Kitt Peak || Spacewatch || — || align=right | 2.3 km || 
|-id=230 bgcolor=#E9E9E9
| 468230 ||  || — || January 4, 2006 || Mount Lemmon || Mount Lemmon Survey || — || align=right | 2.0 km || 
|-id=231 bgcolor=#d6d6d6
| 468231 ||  || — || January 15, 2005 || Kitt Peak || Spacewatch || — || align=right | 2.4 km || 
|-id=232 bgcolor=#E9E9E9
| 468232 ||  || — || December 5, 2005 || Kitt Peak || Spacewatch || — || align=right | 2.4 km || 
|-id=233 bgcolor=#d6d6d6
| 468233 ||  || — || January 7, 2010 || Mount Lemmon || Mount Lemmon Survey || — || align=right | 1.9 km || 
|-id=234 bgcolor=#E9E9E9
| 468234 ||  || — || January 31, 2006 || Kitt Peak || Spacewatch || — || align=right | 1.8 km || 
|-id=235 bgcolor=#d6d6d6
| 468235 ||  || — || September 23, 2008 || Catalina || CSS || — || align=right | 2.6 km || 
|-id=236 bgcolor=#E9E9E9
| 468236 ||  || — || January 7, 2006 || Mount Lemmon || Mount Lemmon Survey || — || align=right | 2.1 km || 
|-id=237 bgcolor=#E9E9E9
| 468237 ||  || — || January 15, 2010 || WISE || WISE || — || align=right | 2.4 km || 
|-id=238 bgcolor=#E9E9E9
| 468238 ||  || — || April 14, 2007 || Mount Lemmon || Mount Lemmon Survey || — || align=right | 1.8 km || 
|-id=239 bgcolor=#d6d6d6
| 468239 ||  || — || November 15, 2003 || Kitt Peak || Spacewatch || — || align=right | 2.3 km || 
|-id=240 bgcolor=#d6d6d6
| 468240 ||  || — || March 23, 2004 || Kitt Peak || Spacewatch || HYG || align=right | 2.8 km || 
|-id=241 bgcolor=#d6d6d6
| 468241 ||  || — || April 30, 2006 || Kitt Peak || Spacewatch || — || align=right | 2.1 km || 
|-id=242 bgcolor=#E9E9E9
| 468242 ||  || — || December 28, 2005 || Mount Lemmon || Mount Lemmon Survey || — || align=right | 1.5 km || 
|-id=243 bgcolor=#E9E9E9
| 468243 ||  || — || January 26, 2006 || Kitt Peak || Spacewatch || — || align=right | 2.0 km || 
|-id=244 bgcolor=#E9E9E9
| 468244 ||  || — || December 17, 2009 || Kitt Peak || Spacewatch || AGN || align=right | 1.5 km || 
|-id=245 bgcolor=#E9E9E9
| 468245 ||  || — || October 1, 1999 || Kitt Peak || Spacewatch || — || align=right | 2.5 km || 
|-id=246 bgcolor=#d6d6d6
| 468246 ||  || — || December 18, 2003 || Kitt Peak || Spacewatch || EOS || align=right | 2.6 km || 
|-id=247 bgcolor=#fefefe
| 468247 ||  || — || April 28, 2012 || Mount Lemmon || Mount Lemmon Survey || V || align=right data-sort-value="0.68" | 680 m || 
|-id=248 bgcolor=#d6d6d6
| 468248 ||  || — || January 8, 2010 || Kitt Peak || Spacewatch || — || align=right | 2.9 km || 
|-id=249 bgcolor=#d6d6d6
| 468249 ||  || — || June 5, 2010 || WISE || WISE || EOS || align=right | 1.8 km || 
|-id=250 bgcolor=#d6d6d6
| 468250 ||  || — || February 13, 2010 || Mount Lemmon || Mount Lemmon Survey || — || align=right | 2.8 km || 
|-id=251 bgcolor=#d6d6d6
| 468251 ||  || — || February 12, 2004 || Kitt Peak || Spacewatch || — || align=right | 2.9 km || 
|-id=252 bgcolor=#E9E9E9
| 468252 ||  || — || October 9, 2004 || Kitt Peak || Spacewatch || — || align=right | 2.3 km || 
|-id=253 bgcolor=#d6d6d6
| 468253 ||  || — || June 27, 2010 || WISE || WISE || — || align=right | 2.9 km || 
|-id=254 bgcolor=#d6d6d6
| 468254 ||  || — || October 27, 2013 || Catalina || CSS || — || align=right | 3.7 km || 
|-id=255 bgcolor=#d6d6d6
| 468255 ||  || — || March 21, 2010 || Catalina || CSS || EOS || align=right | 2.4 km || 
|-id=256 bgcolor=#d6d6d6
| 468256 ||  || — || October 8, 2008 || Kitt Peak || Spacewatch || KOR || align=right | 1.5 km || 
|-id=257 bgcolor=#d6d6d6
| 468257 ||  || — || December 10, 2005 || Kitt Peak || Spacewatch || KOR || align=right | 1.6 km || 
|-id=258 bgcolor=#fefefe
| 468258 ||  || — || May 20, 2006 || Kitt Peak || Spacewatch || — || align=right data-sort-value="0.99" | 990 m || 
|-id=259 bgcolor=#E9E9E9
| 468259 ||  || — || November 24, 2009 || Kitt Peak || Spacewatch || — || align=right | 2.1 km || 
|-id=260 bgcolor=#E9E9E9
| 468260 ||  || — || November 10, 2009 || Mount Lemmon || Mount Lemmon Survey || (5) || align=right data-sort-value="0.68" | 680 m || 
|-id=261 bgcolor=#d6d6d6
| 468261 ||  || — || May 8, 2010 || WISE || WISE || — || align=right | 4.3 km || 
|-id=262 bgcolor=#E9E9E9
| 468262 ||  || — || February 1, 2006 || Kitt Peak || Spacewatch || — || align=right | 2.1 km || 
|-id=263 bgcolor=#E9E9E9
| 468263 ||  || — || September 29, 1994 || Kitt Peak || Spacewatch || AST || align=right | 2.0 km || 
|-id=264 bgcolor=#d6d6d6
| 468264 ||  || — || February 10, 2010 || Kitt Peak || Spacewatch || — || align=right | 2.8 km || 
|-id=265 bgcolor=#E9E9E9
| 468265 ||  || — || October 14, 2009 || Mount Lemmon || Mount Lemmon Survey || — || align=right | 1.3 km || 
|-id=266 bgcolor=#fefefe
| 468266 ||  || — || December 27, 2006 || Mount Lemmon || Mount Lemmon Survey || — || align=right data-sort-value="0.81" | 810 m || 
|-id=267 bgcolor=#E9E9E9
| 468267 ||  || — || December 10, 2009 || Mount Lemmon || Mount Lemmon Survey || — || align=right | 2.5 km || 
|-id=268 bgcolor=#d6d6d6
| 468268 ||  || — || September 12, 2007 || Mount Lemmon || Mount Lemmon Survey || — || align=right | 2.4 km || 
|-id=269 bgcolor=#E9E9E9
| 468269 ||  || — || March 2, 2006 || Kitt Peak || Spacewatch || — || align=right | 2.7 km || 
|-id=270 bgcolor=#E9E9E9
| 468270 ||  || — || January 26, 2006 || Kitt Peak || Spacewatch || AGN || align=right | 1.1 km || 
|-id=271 bgcolor=#d6d6d6
| 468271 ||  || — || June 16, 2010 || WISE || WISE || HYG || align=right | 3.1 km || 
|-id=272 bgcolor=#d6d6d6
| 468272 ||  || — || September 24, 2008 || Kitt Peak || Spacewatch || — || align=right | 2.5 km || 
|-id=273 bgcolor=#d6d6d6
| 468273 ||  || — || February 16, 2004 || Kitt Peak || Spacewatch || — || align=right | 3.1 km || 
|-id=274 bgcolor=#d6d6d6
| 468274 ||  || — || January 6, 2010 || Kitt Peak || Spacewatch || — || align=right | 2.8 km || 
|-id=275 bgcolor=#d6d6d6
| 468275 ||  || — || June 23, 2010 || WISE || WISE || — || align=right | 4.0 km || 
|-id=276 bgcolor=#E9E9E9
| 468276 ||  || — || April 25, 2007 || Kitt Peak || Spacewatch || — || align=right | 2.0 km || 
|-id=277 bgcolor=#d6d6d6
| 468277 ||  || — || September 15, 2007 || Mount Lemmon || Mount Lemmon Survey || — || align=right | 3.0 km || 
|-id=278 bgcolor=#d6d6d6
| 468278 ||  || — || October 11, 2012 || Mount Lemmon || Mount Lemmon Survey ||  || align=right | 2.7 km || 
|-id=279 bgcolor=#E9E9E9
| 468279 ||  || — || October 15, 2009 || Catalina || CSS || — || align=right | 3.1 km || 
|-id=280 bgcolor=#d6d6d6
| 468280 ||  || — || March 20, 2010 || Mount Lemmon || Mount Lemmon Survey || — || align=right | 2.6 km || 
|-id=281 bgcolor=#E9E9E9
| 468281 ||  || — || September 15, 2004 || Kitt Peak || Spacewatch || — || align=right | 1.4 km || 
|-id=282 bgcolor=#d6d6d6
| 468282 ||  || — || December 21, 2008 || Kitt Peak || Spacewatch || THM || align=right | 2.1 km || 
|-id=283 bgcolor=#fefefe
| 468283 ||  || — || February 26, 2008 || Mount Lemmon || Mount Lemmon Survey || — || align=right data-sort-value="0.89" | 890 m || 
|-id=284 bgcolor=#d6d6d6
| 468284 ||  || — || January 1, 2009 || Kitt Peak || Spacewatch || — || align=right | 2.5 km || 
|-id=285 bgcolor=#d6d6d6
| 468285 ||  || — || November 18, 2008 || Kitt Peak || Spacewatch || — || align=right | 3.4 km || 
|-id=286 bgcolor=#E9E9E9
| 468286 ||  || — || April 25, 2007 || Kitt Peak || Spacewatch || — || align=right | 2.2 km || 
|-id=287 bgcolor=#d6d6d6
| 468287 ||  || — || October 6, 2007 || Kitt Peak || Spacewatch || — || align=right | 2.8 km || 
|-id=288 bgcolor=#d6d6d6
| 468288 ||  || — || September 26, 2008 || Kitt Peak || Spacewatch || — || align=right | 2.5 km || 
|-id=289 bgcolor=#E9E9E9
| 468289 ||  || — || September 22, 2008 || Catalina || CSS || — || align=right | 2.9 km || 
|-id=290 bgcolor=#d6d6d6
| 468290 ||  || — || January 2, 2009 || Mount Lemmon || Mount Lemmon Survey || EOS || align=right | 2.1 km || 
|-id=291 bgcolor=#d6d6d6
| 468291 ||  || — || December 29, 2003 || Kitt Peak || Spacewatch || EOS || align=right | 1.7 km || 
|-id=292 bgcolor=#d6d6d6
| 468292 ||  || — || October 12, 2007 || Mount Lemmon || Mount Lemmon Survey || — || align=right | 3.2 km || 
|-id=293 bgcolor=#E9E9E9
| 468293 ||  || — || October 6, 1999 || Kitt Peak || Spacewatch || — || align=right | 3.1 km || 
|-id=294 bgcolor=#d6d6d6
| 468294 ||  || — || January 1, 2009 || Mount Lemmon || Mount Lemmon Survey || — || align=right | 2.3 km || 
|-id=295 bgcolor=#d6d6d6
| 468295 ||  || — || December 29, 2003 || Kitt Peak || Spacewatch || — || align=right | 3.1 km || 
|-id=296 bgcolor=#E9E9E9
| 468296 ||  || — || November 9, 1999 || Kitt Peak || Spacewatch || HOF || align=right | 2.4 km || 
|-id=297 bgcolor=#E9E9E9
| 468297 ||  || — || October 10, 2004 || Kitt Peak || Spacewatch || PAD || align=right | 2.0 km || 
|-id=298 bgcolor=#d6d6d6
| 468298 ||  || — || December 21, 2008 || Kitt Peak || Spacewatch || — || align=right | 2.8 km || 
|-id=299 bgcolor=#E9E9E9
| 468299 ||  || — || November 3, 2005 || Catalina || CSS || — || align=right | 1.3 km || 
|-id=300 bgcolor=#fefefe
| 468300 ||  || — || December 27, 2006 || Kitt Peak || Spacewatch || — || align=right | 1.3 km || 
|}

468301–468400 

|-bgcolor=#E9E9E9
| 468301 ||  || — || June 14, 2012 || Mount Lemmon || Mount Lemmon Survey || MAR || align=right data-sort-value="0.93" | 930 m || 
|-id=302 bgcolor=#C2FFFF
| 468302 ||  || — || September 21, 2009 || Kitt Peak || Spacewatch || L4 || align=right | 9.4 km || 
|-id=303 bgcolor=#E9E9E9
| 468303 ||  || — || April 11, 2007 || Siding Spring || SSS || MAR || align=right | 1.5 km || 
|-id=304 bgcolor=#C2FFFF
| 468304 ||  || — || November 12, 2010 || Kitt Peak || Spacewatch || L4 || align=right | 8.1 km || 
|-id=305 bgcolor=#FA8072
| 468305 ||  || — || August 21, 2008 || Kitt Peak || Spacewatch || — || align=right | 1.2 km || 
|-id=306 bgcolor=#d6d6d6
| 468306 ||  || — || March 8, 2005 || Catalina || CSS || VER || align=right | 3.7 km || 
|-id=307 bgcolor=#d6d6d6
| 468307 ||  || — || December 10, 2004 || Socorro || LINEAR || — || align=right | 3.9 km || 
|-id=308 bgcolor=#E9E9E9
| 468308 ||  || — || November 4, 2005 || Mount Lemmon || Mount Lemmon Survey || — || align=right | 2.1 km || 
|-id=309 bgcolor=#E9E9E9
| 468309 ||  || — || June 19, 2004 || Anderson Mesa || LONEOS || JUN || align=right | 1.2 km || 
|-id=310 bgcolor=#E9E9E9
| 468310 ||  || — || June 1, 2008 || Mount Lemmon || Mount Lemmon Survey || — || align=right | 2.7 km || 
|-id=311 bgcolor=#fefefe
| 468311 ||  || — || April 17, 2009 || Catalina || CSS || — || align=right data-sort-value="0.73" | 730 m || 
|-id=312 bgcolor=#d6d6d6
| 468312 ||  || — || January 27, 2006 || Catalina || CSS || — || align=right | 4.2 km || 
|-id=313 bgcolor=#d6d6d6
| 468313 ||  || — || October 27, 2003 || Kitt Peak || Spacewatch || — || align=right | 3.9 km || 
|-id=314 bgcolor=#E9E9E9
| 468314 ||  || — || March 30, 2008 || Catalina || CSS || — || align=right | 1.1 km || 
|-id=315 bgcolor=#E9E9E9
| 468315 ||  || — || January 13, 2002 || Kitt Peak || Spacewatch || — || align=right | 2.9 km || 
|-id=316 bgcolor=#E9E9E9
| 468316 ||  || — || December 14, 2010 || Mount Lemmon || Mount Lemmon Survey || — || align=right | 2.8 km || 
|-id=317 bgcolor=#E9E9E9
| 468317 ||  || — || December 8, 2010 || Catalina || CSS || — || align=right | 1.4 km || 
|-id=318 bgcolor=#d6d6d6
| 468318 ||  || — || September 21, 2003 || Kitt Peak || Spacewatch || — || align=right | 2.8 km || 
|-id=319 bgcolor=#d6d6d6
| 468319 ||  || — || November 3, 1999 || Kitt Peak || Spacewatch || — || align=right | 3.2 km || 
|-id=320 bgcolor=#fefefe
| 468320 ||  || — || September 30, 2010 || Mount Lemmon || Mount Lemmon Survey || — || align=right | 1.3 km || 
|-id=321 bgcolor=#fefefe
| 468321 ||  || — || November 10, 2004 || Kitt Peak || Spacewatch || — || align=right data-sort-value="0.68" | 680 m || 
|-id=322 bgcolor=#E9E9E9
| 468322 ||  || — || January 27, 2007 || Catalina || CSS || 526 || align=right | 2.8 km || 
|-id=323 bgcolor=#d6d6d6
| 468323 ||  || — || May 2, 2006 || Mount Lemmon || Mount Lemmon Survey || EOS || align=right | 1.7 km || 
|-id=324 bgcolor=#E9E9E9
| 468324 ||  || — || June 17, 2009 || Mount Lemmon || Mount Lemmon Survey || — || align=right | 2.5 km || 
|-id=325 bgcolor=#E9E9E9
| 468325 ||  || — || March 14, 2007 || Anderson Mesa || LONEOS || GEF || align=right | 1.9 km || 
|-id=326 bgcolor=#d6d6d6
| 468326 ||  || — || March 3, 2005 || Catalina || CSS || — || align=right | 4.5 km || 
|-id=327 bgcolor=#d6d6d6
| 468327 ||  || — || March 26, 2010 || WISE || WISE || LIX || align=right | 3.9 km || 
|-id=328 bgcolor=#d6d6d6
| 468328 ||  || — || December 18, 2009 || Mount Lemmon || Mount Lemmon Survey || — || align=right | 3.8 km || 
|-id=329 bgcolor=#E9E9E9
| 468329 ||  || — || October 21, 2006 || Catalina || CSS || MAR || align=right | 1.4 km || 
|-id=330 bgcolor=#E9E9E9
| 468330 ||  || — || October 26, 2005 || Kitt Peak || Spacewatch || — || align=right | 1.9 km || 
|-id=331 bgcolor=#E9E9E9
| 468331 ||  || — || November 16, 2006 || Mount Lemmon || Mount Lemmon Survey || EUN || align=right data-sort-value="0.89" | 890 m || 
|-id=332 bgcolor=#E9E9E9
| 468332 ||  || — || March 17, 2012 || Catalina || CSS || — || align=right | 1.9 km || 
|-id=333 bgcolor=#E9E9E9
| 468333 ||  || — || August 17, 2009 || Kitt Peak || Spacewatch || — || align=right | 1.6 km || 
|-id=334 bgcolor=#d6d6d6
| 468334 ||  || — || December 20, 2009 || Mount Lemmon || Mount Lemmon Survey || — || align=right | 2.9 km || 
|-id=335 bgcolor=#fefefe
| 468335 ||  || — || April 7, 2008 || Mount Lemmon || Mount Lemmon Survey || H || align=right data-sort-value="0.70" | 700 m || 
|-id=336 bgcolor=#d6d6d6
| 468336 ||  || — || October 28, 2008 || Mount Lemmon || Mount Lemmon Survey || — || align=right | 2.5 km || 
|-id=337 bgcolor=#E9E9E9
| 468337 ||  || — || December 14, 2006 || Kitt Peak || Spacewatch || — || align=right | 1.1 km || 
|-id=338 bgcolor=#E9E9E9
| 468338 ||  || — || January 29, 2011 || Mount Lemmon || Mount Lemmon Survey || — || align=right | 1.3 km || 
|-id=339 bgcolor=#d6d6d6
| 468339 ||  || — || January 12, 2010 || Kitt Peak || Spacewatch || — || align=right | 3.0 km || 
|-id=340 bgcolor=#d6d6d6
| 468340 ||  || — || February 9, 2010 || Kitt Peak || Spacewatch || — || align=right | 2.7 km || 
|-id=341 bgcolor=#d6d6d6
| 468341 ||  || — || March 10, 2005 || Mount Lemmon || Mount Lemmon Survey || — || align=right | 2.9 km || 
|-id=342 bgcolor=#fefefe
| 468342 ||  || — || November 30, 2008 || Kitt Peak || Spacewatch || — || align=right data-sort-value="0.74" | 740 m || 
|-id=343 bgcolor=#fefefe
| 468343 ||  || — || October 1, 1999 || Kitt Peak || Spacewatch || — || align=right data-sort-value="0.88" | 880 m || 
|-id=344 bgcolor=#fefefe
| 468344 ||  || — || July 7, 2005 || Kitt Peak || Spacewatch || — || align=right | 1.0 km || 
|-id=345 bgcolor=#fefefe
| 468345 ||  || — || May 24, 2006 || Kitt Peak || Spacewatch || — || align=right data-sort-value="0.87" | 870 m || 
|-id=346 bgcolor=#E9E9E9
| 468346 ||  || — || February 16, 2002 || Kitt Peak || Spacewatch || — || align=right | 2.0 km || 
|-id=347 bgcolor=#E9E9E9
| 468347 ||  || — || January 13, 2002 || Kitt Peak || Spacewatch || — || align=right | 2.2 km || 
|-id=348 bgcolor=#E9E9E9
| 468348 ||  || — || August 16, 2009 || Kitt Peak || Spacewatch || — || align=right | 2.0 km || 
|-id=349 bgcolor=#d6d6d6
| 468349 ||  || — || October 30, 2008 || Mount Lemmon || Mount Lemmon Survey || — || align=right | 2.6 km || 
|-id=350 bgcolor=#E9E9E9
| 468350 ||  || — || April 20, 2012 || Siding Spring || SSS || (194) || align=right | 1.8 km || 
|-id=351 bgcolor=#E9E9E9
| 468351 ||  || — || March 11, 2007 || Mount Lemmon || Mount Lemmon Survey || — || align=right | 2.5 km || 
|-id=352 bgcolor=#d6d6d6
| 468352 ||  || — || April 5, 2000 || Kitt Peak || Spacewatch || — || align=right | 3.2 km || 
|-id=353 bgcolor=#fefefe
| 468353 ||  || — || September 18, 2010 || Mount Lemmon || Mount Lemmon Survey || — || align=right data-sort-value="0.98" | 980 m || 
|-id=354 bgcolor=#d6d6d6
| 468354 ||  || — || October 4, 2007 || Mount Lemmon || Mount Lemmon Survey || VER || align=right | 2.6 km || 
|-id=355 bgcolor=#E9E9E9
| 468355 ||  || — || September 29, 2009 || Mount Lemmon || Mount Lemmon Survey || — || align=right | 1.4 km || 
|-id=356 bgcolor=#d6d6d6
| 468356 ||  || — || March 8, 2005 || Mount Lemmon || Mount Lemmon Survey || — || align=right | 2.5 km || 
|-id=357 bgcolor=#E9E9E9
| 468357 ||  || — || October 12, 2005 || Kitt Peak || Spacewatch || — || align=right | 1.2 km || 
|-id=358 bgcolor=#E9E9E9
| 468358 ||  || — || December 3, 2010 || Catalina || CSS || — || align=right | 1.6 km || 
|-id=359 bgcolor=#E9E9E9
| 468359 ||  || — || January 28, 2007 || Catalina || CSS || — || align=right | 2.9 km || 
|-id=360 bgcolor=#E9E9E9
| 468360 ||  || — || January 11, 1999 || Kitt Peak || Spacewatch || EUN || align=right | 1.4 km || 
|-id=361 bgcolor=#E9E9E9
| 468361 ||  || — || March 21, 2002 || Kitt Peak || Spacewatch || — || align=right | 2.4 km || 
|-id=362 bgcolor=#d6d6d6
| 468362 ||  || — || February 18, 2010 || Kitt Peak || Spacewatch || — || align=right | 2.7 km || 
|-id=363 bgcolor=#d6d6d6
| 468363 ||  || — || May 8, 2005 || Mount Lemmon || Mount Lemmon Survey || — || align=right | 3.4 km || 
|-id=364 bgcolor=#d6d6d6
| 468364 ||  || — || November 9, 2009 || Kitt Peak || Spacewatch || — || align=right | 1.9 km || 
|-id=365 bgcolor=#E9E9E9
| 468365 ||  || — || February 25, 2012 || Mount Lemmon || Mount Lemmon Survey || — || align=right | 1.8 km || 
|-id=366 bgcolor=#d6d6d6
| 468366 ||  || — || September 19, 2001 || Socorro || LINEAR || — || align=right | 4.8 km || 
|-id=367 bgcolor=#d6d6d6
| 468367 ||  || — || November 22, 2009 || Mount Lemmon || Mount Lemmon Survey || — || align=right | 4.3 km || 
|-id=368 bgcolor=#fefefe
| 468368 ||  || — || October 8, 1996 || Kitt Peak || Spacewatch || — || align=right data-sort-value="0.86" | 860 m || 
|-id=369 bgcolor=#d6d6d6
| 468369 ||  || — || April 30, 2011 || Mount Lemmon || Mount Lemmon Survey || — || align=right | 2.6 km || 
|-id=370 bgcolor=#d6d6d6
| 468370 ||  || — || March 4, 2005 || Mount Lemmon || Mount Lemmon Survey || — || align=right | 1.8 km || 
|-id=371 bgcolor=#d6d6d6
| 468371 ||  || — || May 24, 2001 || Kitt Peak || Spacewatch || — || align=right | 2.3 km || 
|-id=372 bgcolor=#d6d6d6
| 468372 ||  || — || November 7, 2007 || Mount Lemmon || Mount Lemmon Survey || — || align=right | 3.4 km || 
|-id=373 bgcolor=#E9E9E9
| 468373 ||  || — || November 28, 2005 || Mount Lemmon || Mount Lemmon Survey || — || align=right | 1.7 km || 
|-id=374 bgcolor=#fefefe
| 468374 ||  || — || May 9, 2002 || Socorro || LINEAR || V || align=right data-sort-value="0.95" | 950 m || 
|-id=375 bgcolor=#d6d6d6
| 468375 ||  || — || January 31, 2006 || Kitt Peak || Spacewatch || KOR || align=right | 1.7 km || 
|-id=376 bgcolor=#E9E9E9
| 468376 ||  || — || September 1, 2005 || Kitt Peak || Spacewatch || — || align=right | 1.0 km || 
|-id=377 bgcolor=#E9E9E9
| 468377 ||  || — || March 12, 2008 || Kitt Peak || Spacewatch || — || align=right | 1.5 km || 
|-id=378 bgcolor=#E9E9E9
| 468378 ||  || — || October 17, 2009 || Mount Lemmon || Mount Lemmon Survey || — || align=right | 1.4 km || 
|-id=379 bgcolor=#fefefe
| 468379 ||  || — || March 10, 2005 || Kitt Peak || Spacewatch || NYS || align=right data-sort-value="0.55" | 550 m || 
|-id=380 bgcolor=#d6d6d6
| 468380 ||  || — || January 29, 2009 || Mount Lemmon || Mount Lemmon Survey || 7:4 || align=right | 3.6 km || 
|-id=381 bgcolor=#d6d6d6
| 468381 ||  || — || October 29, 2008 || Kitt Peak || Spacewatch || — || align=right | 3.7 km || 
|-id=382 bgcolor=#E9E9E9
| 468382 ||  || — || October 26, 2009 || Kitt Peak || Spacewatch || — || align=right | 1.6 km || 
|-id=383 bgcolor=#fefefe
| 468383 ||  || — || May 25, 2006 || Kitt Peak || Spacewatch || — || align=right data-sort-value="0.97" | 970 m || 
|-id=384 bgcolor=#E9E9E9
| 468384 ||  || — || October 9, 2013 || Kitt Peak || Spacewatch || MRX || align=right | 1.1 km || 
|-id=385 bgcolor=#fefefe
| 468385 ||  || — || February 2, 2005 || Kitt Peak || Spacewatch || NYS || align=right data-sort-value="0.46" | 460 m || 
|-id=386 bgcolor=#fefefe
| 468386 ||  || — || December 29, 2003 || Kitt Peak || Spacewatch || — || align=right data-sort-value="0.92" | 920 m || 
|-id=387 bgcolor=#fefefe
| 468387 ||  || — || November 12, 2007 || Mount Lemmon || Mount Lemmon Survey || — || align=right data-sort-value="0.54" | 540 m || 
|-id=388 bgcolor=#d6d6d6
| 468388 ||  || — || October 10, 2007 || Mount Lemmon || Mount Lemmon Survey || VER || align=right | 2.4 km || 
|-id=389 bgcolor=#fefefe
| 468389 ||  || — || February 7, 2008 || Kitt Peak || Spacewatch || — || align=right data-sort-value="0.71" | 710 m || 
|-id=390 bgcolor=#E9E9E9
| 468390 ||  || — || October 8, 2004 || Kitt Peak || Spacewatch || — || align=right | 2.1 km || 
|-id=391 bgcolor=#d6d6d6
| 468391 ||  || — || April 6, 2005 || Kitt Peak || Spacewatch || — || align=right | 3.4 km || 
|-id=392 bgcolor=#fefefe
| 468392 ||  || — || December 14, 2004 || Catalina || CSS || — || align=right data-sort-value="0.71" | 710 m || 
|-id=393 bgcolor=#d6d6d6
| 468393 ||  || — || April 5, 2011 || Mount Lemmon || Mount Lemmon Survey || — || align=right | 1.7 km || 
|-id=394 bgcolor=#fefefe
| 468394 ||  || — || June 24, 2009 || Mount Lemmon || Mount Lemmon Survey || — || align=right data-sort-value="0.79" | 790 m || 
|-id=395 bgcolor=#d6d6d6
| 468395 ||  || — || March 13, 2005 || Kitt Peak || Spacewatch || — || align=right | 2.3 km || 
|-id=396 bgcolor=#E9E9E9
| 468396 ||  || — || September 13, 2005 || Kitt Peak || Spacewatch || — || align=right | 1.00 km || 
|-id=397 bgcolor=#d6d6d6
| 468397 ||  || — || June 1, 2010 || WISE || WISE || VER || align=right | 3.8 km || 
|-id=398 bgcolor=#d6d6d6
| 468398 ||  || — || September 30, 2003 || Kitt Peak || Spacewatch || KOR || align=right | 1.7 km || 
|-id=399 bgcolor=#d6d6d6
| 468399 ||  || — || September 15, 2006 || Kitt Peak || Spacewatch || — || align=right | 2.5 km || 
|-id=400 bgcolor=#E9E9E9
| 468400 ||  || — || November 5, 2005 || Mount Lemmon || Mount Lemmon Survey || — || align=right data-sort-value="0.93" | 930 m || 
|}

468401–468500 

|-bgcolor=#fefefe
| 468401 ||  || — || October 11, 2007 || Kitt Peak || Spacewatch || — || align=right data-sort-value="0.65" | 650 m || 
|-id=402 bgcolor=#fefefe
| 468402 ||  || — || April 22, 2009 || Mount Lemmon || Mount Lemmon Survey || — || align=right data-sort-value="0.58" | 580 m || 
|-id=403 bgcolor=#d6d6d6
| 468403 ||  || — || April 3, 2010 || WISE || WISE || NAE || align=right | 3.1 km || 
|-id=404 bgcolor=#d6d6d6
| 468404 ||  || — || February 24, 2006 || Mount Lemmon || Mount Lemmon Survey || KOR || align=right | 1.6 km || 
|-id=405 bgcolor=#fefefe
| 468405 ||  || — || November 29, 2011 || Kitt Peak || Spacewatch || — || align=right data-sort-value="0.89" | 890 m || 
|-id=406 bgcolor=#d6d6d6
| 468406 ||  || — || March 17, 2005 || Catalina || CSS || — || align=right | 4.2 km || 
|-id=407 bgcolor=#fefefe
| 468407 ||  || — || April 2, 2005 || Mount Lemmon || Mount Lemmon Survey || — || align=right data-sort-value="0.92" | 920 m || 
|-id=408 bgcolor=#E9E9E9
| 468408 ||  || — || January 7, 2006 || Kitt Peak || Spacewatch || — || align=right | 1.9 km || 
|-id=409 bgcolor=#d6d6d6
| 468409 ||  || — || September 13, 2007 || Mount Lemmon || Mount Lemmon Survey || EOS || align=right | 1.8 km || 
|-id=410 bgcolor=#d6d6d6
| 468410 ||  || — || May 25, 2006 || Mount Lemmon || Mount Lemmon Survey || — || align=right | 2.4 km || 
|-id=411 bgcolor=#d6d6d6
| 468411 ||  || — || January 12, 2010 || Catalina || CSS || — || align=right | 3.3 km || 
|-id=412 bgcolor=#d6d6d6
| 468412 ||  || — || February 14, 2010 || Kitt Peak || Spacewatch || — || align=right | 3.6 km || 
|-id=413 bgcolor=#E9E9E9
| 468413 ||  || — || July 1, 2008 || Kitt Peak || Spacewatch || — || align=right | 1.6 km || 
|-id=414 bgcolor=#E9E9E9
| 468414 ||  || — || November 6, 2010 || Mount Lemmon || Mount Lemmon Survey || — || align=right | 1.0 km || 
|-id=415 bgcolor=#E9E9E9
| 468415 ||  || — || December 22, 2005 || Kitt Peak || Spacewatch || — || align=right | 1.9 km || 
|-id=416 bgcolor=#fefefe
| 468416 ||  || — || September 19, 2003 || Kitt Peak || Spacewatch || — || align=right data-sort-value="0.77" | 770 m || 
|-id=417 bgcolor=#d6d6d6
| 468417 ||  || — || September 27, 1995 || Kitt Peak || Spacewatch || — || align=right | 2.4 km || 
|-id=418 bgcolor=#E9E9E9
| 468418 ||  || — || February 10, 1999 || Socorro || LINEAR || — || align=right | 1.5 km || 
|-id=419 bgcolor=#E9E9E9
| 468419 ||  || — || October 7, 1999 || Goodricke-Pigott || R. A. Tucker || — || align=right | 1.6 km || 
|-id=420 bgcolor=#E9E9E9
| 468420 ||  || — || October 6, 1999 || Socorro || LINEAR || — || align=right | 1.4 km || 
|-id=421 bgcolor=#FA8072
| 468421 ||  || — || November 3, 1999 || Socorro || LINEAR || H || align=right data-sort-value="0.65" | 650 m || 
|-id=422 bgcolor=#C2E0FF
| 468422 ||  || — || March 27, 2000 || Mauna Kea || J. J. Kavelaars, B. Gladman, J.-M. Petit, M. J. Holman || cubewano (cold)critical || align=right | 140 km || 
|-id=423 bgcolor=#fefefe
| 468423 ||  || — || May 25, 2000 || Kitt Peak || Spacewatch || — || align=right | 1.1 km || 
|-id=424 bgcolor=#E9E9E9
| 468424 ||  || — || August 31, 2000 || Socorro || LINEAR || — || align=right data-sort-value="0.96" | 960 m || 
|-id=425 bgcolor=#E9E9E9
| 468425 ||  || — || October 7, 2000 || Kitt Peak || Spacewatch || — || align=right | 1.8 km || 
|-id=426 bgcolor=#E9E9E9
| 468426 ||  || — || October 25, 2000 || Socorro || LINEAR || (5) || align=right data-sort-value="0.89" | 890 m || 
|-id=427 bgcolor=#E9E9E9
| 468427 ||  || — || November 20, 2000 || Socorro || LINEAR || — || align=right | 3.0 km || 
|-id=428 bgcolor=#fefefe
| 468428 ||  || — || August 11, 2001 || Palomar || NEAT || — || align=right | 2.6 km || 
|-id=429 bgcolor=#d6d6d6
| 468429 ||  || — || September 12, 2001 || Socorro || LINEAR || — || align=right | 3.5 km || 
|-id=430 bgcolor=#fefefe
| 468430 ||  || — || September 12, 2001 || Socorro || LINEAR || — || align=right data-sort-value="0.94" | 940 m || 
|-id=431 bgcolor=#fefefe
| 468431 ||  || — || September 16, 2001 || Socorro || LINEAR || — || align=right data-sort-value="0.74" | 740 m || 
|-id=432 bgcolor=#d6d6d6
| 468432 ||  || — || September 20, 2001 || Socorro || LINEAR || — || align=right | 2.4 km || 
|-id=433 bgcolor=#d6d6d6
| 468433 ||  || — || October 10, 2001 || Palomar || NEAT || — || align=right | 3.1 km || 
|-id=434 bgcolor=#fefefe
| 468434 ||  || — || October 17, 2001 || Socorro || LINEAR || — || align=right | 1.2 km || 
|-id=435 bgcolor=#fefefe
| 468435 ||  || — || October 19, 2001 || Haleakala || NEAT || — || align=right data-sort-value="0.94" | 940 m || 
|-id=436 bgcolor=#FA8072
| 468436 ||  || — || November 19, 2001 || Socorro || LINEAR || — || align=right data-sort-value="0.58" | 580 m || 
|-id=437 bgcolor=#E9E9E9
| 468437 ||  || — || December 10, 2001 || Kitt Peak || Spacewatch || — || align=right | 1.8 km || 
|-id=438 bgcolor=#E9E9E9
| 468438 ||  || — || December 14, 2001 || Socorro || LINEAR || — || align=right | 2.2 km || 
|-id=439 bgcolor=#fefefe
| 468439 ||  || — || January 12, 2002 || Socorro || LINEAR || H || align=right data-sort-value="0.94" | 940 m || 
|-id=440 bgcolor=#E9E9E9
| 468440 ||  || — || January 12, 2002 || Kitt Peak || Spacewatch || — || align=right | 1.7 km || 
|-id=441 bgcolor=#FA8072
| 468441 ||  || — || July 18, 2002 || Socorro || LINEAR || — || align=right data-sort-value="0.95" | 950 m || 
|-id=442 bgcolor=#d6d6d6
| 468442 ||  || — || August 18, 2002 || Palomar || NEAT || — || align=right | 2.5 km || 
|-id=443 bgcolor=#fefefe
| 468443 ||  || — || August 16, 2002 || Palomar || NEAT || — || align=right data-sort-value="0.73" | 730 m || 
|-id=444 bgcolor=#d6d6d6
| 468444 ||  || — || September 15, 2002 || Kitt Peak || Spacewatch || — || align=right | 2.2 km || 
|-id=445 bgcolor=#FA8072
| 468445 ||  || — || September 30, 2002 || Socorro || LINEAR || H || align=right data-sort-value="0.77" | 770 m || 
|-id=446 bgcolor=#FFC2E0
| 468446 ||  || — || December 5, 2002 || Socorro || LINEAR || AMO || align=right data-sort-value="0.41" | 410 m || 
|-id=447 bgcolor=#E9E9E9
| 468447 ||  || — || March 7, 2003 || Palomar || NEAT || — || align=right data-sort-value="0.87" | 870 m || 
|-id=448 bgcolor=#FFC2E0
| 468448 ||  || — || June 4, 2003 || Socorro || LINEAR || AMO +1km || align=right data-sort-value="0.97" | 970 m || 
|-id=449 bgcolor=#FA8072
| 468449 ||  || — || June 24, 2003 || Campo Imperatore || CINEOS || — || align=right data-sort-value="0.71" | 710 m || 
|-id=450 bgcolor=#FA8072
| 468450 ||  || — || July 29, 2003 || Socorro || LINEAR || — || align=right | 1.4 km || 
|-id=451 bgcolor=#E9E9E9
| 468451 ||  || — || August 31, 2003 || Socorro || LINEAR || — || align=right | 3.2 km || 
|-id=452 bgcolor=#FFC2E0
| 468452 ||  || — || September 22, 2003 || Palomar || NEAT || AMOcritical || align=right data-sort-value="0.54" | 540 m || 
|-id=453 bgcolor=#fefefe
| 468453 ||  || — || September 26, 2003 || Apache Point || SDSS || — || align=right data-sort-value="0.62" | 620 m || 
|-id=454 bgcolor=#E9E9E9
| 468454 ||  || — || September 2, 2003 || Socorro || LINEAR || — || align=right | 2.4 km || 
|-id=455 bgcolor=#fefefe
| 468455 ||  || — || October 21, 2003 || Kitt Peak || Spacewatch || — || align=right data-sort-value="0.72" | 720 m || 
|-id=456 bgcolor=#fefefe
| 468456 ||  || — || October 20, 2003 || Kitt Peak || Spacewatch || — || align=right data-sort-value="0.69" | 690 m || 
|-id=457 bgcolor=#FA8072
| 468457 ||  || — || November 3, 2003 || Socorro || LINEAR || H || align=right data-sort-value="0.81" | 810 m || 
|-id=458 bgcolor=#E9E9E9
| 468458 ||  || — || October 24, 2003 || Socorro || LINEAR || — || align=right | 2.4 km || 
|-id=459 bgcolor=#fefefe
| 468459 ||  || — || November 20, 2003 || Socorro || LINEAR || H || align=right data-sort-value="0.87" | 870 m || 
|-id=460 bgcolor=#d6d6d6
| 468460 || 2003 YA || — || December 16, 2003 || Desert Eagle || W. K. Y. Yeung || — || align=right | 4.0 km || 
|-id=461 bgcolor=#d6d6d6
| 468461 ||  || — || November 24, 2003 || Kitt Peak || Spacewatch || — || align=right | 5.0 km || 
|-id=462 bgcolor=#FFC2E0
| 468462 ||  || — || January 30, 2004 || Kitt Peak || Spacewatch || AMO || align=right data-sort-value="0.51" | 510 m || 
|-id=463 bgcolor=#d6d6d6
| 468463 ||  || — || February 11, 2004 || Palomar || NEAT || THB || align=right | 3.4 km || 
|-id=464 bgcolor=#fefefe
| 468464 ||  || — || March 14, 2004 || Kitt Peak || Spacewatch || — || align=right | 1.2 km || 
|-id=465 bgcolor=#d6d6d6
| 468465 ||  || — || February 29, 2004 || Kitt Peak || Spacewatch || — || align=right | 2.6 km || 
|-id=466 bgcolor=#d6d6d6
| 468466 ||  || — || April 22, 2004 || Kitt Peak || Spacewatch || — || align=right | 3.0 km || 
|-id=467 bgcolor=#d6d6d6
| 468467 ||  || — || May 21, 2004 || Socorro || LINEAR || Tj (2.99) || align=right | 4.9 km || 
|-id=468 bgcolor=#FFC2E0
| 468468 ||  || — || May 29, 2004 || Socorro || LINEAR || ATEPHAcritical || align=right data-sort-value="0.2" | 200 m || 
|-id=469 bgcolor=#E9E9E9
| 468469 ||  || — || July 15, 2004 || Socorro || LINEAR || — || align=right | 1.3 km || 
|-id=470 bgcolor=#E9E9E9
| 468470 ||  || — || August 23, 2004 || Goodricke-Pigott || Goodricke-Pigott Obs. || — || align=right | 1.4 km || 
|-id=471 bgcolor=#E9E9E9
| 468471 ||  || — || September 7, 2004 || Socorro || LINEAR || — || align=right | 1.3 km || 
|-id=472 bgcolor=#E9E9E9
| 468472 ||  || — || September 10, 2004 || Socorro || LINEAR || — || align=right | 2.1 km || 
|-id=473 bgcolor=#E9E9E9
| 468473 ||  || — || September 10, 2004 || Socorro || LINEAR || — || align=right | 1.0 km || 
|-id=474 bgcolor=#E9E9E9
| 468474 ||  || — || September 10, 2004 || Socorro || LINEAR || — || align=right | 1.9 km || 
|-id=475 bgcolor=#E9E9E9
| 468475 ||  || — || September 11, 2004 || Socorro || LINEAR || KON || align=right | 2.7 km || 
|-id=476 bgcolor=#E9E9E9
| 468476 ||  || — || September 11, 2004 || Socorro || LINEAR || — || align=right | 1.9 km || 
|-id=477 bgcolor=#E9E9E9
| 468477 ||  || — || September 10, 2004 || Socorro || LINEAR || — || align=right | 1.5 km || 
|-id=478 bgcolor=#E9E9E9
| 468478 ||  || — || September 13, 2004 || Socorro || LINEAR || — || align=right | 1.2 km || 
|-id=479 bgcolor=#E9E9E9
| 468479 ||  || — || September 14, 2004 || Palomar || NEAT || (1547) || align=right | 1.5 km || 
|-id=480 bgcolor=#E9E9E9
| 468480 ||  || — || October 5, 2004 || Socorro || LINEAR || — || align=right | 1.6 km || 
|-id=481 bgcolor=#FFC2E0
| 468481 ||  || — || October 15, 2004 || Socorro || LINEAR || APO || align=right data-sort-value="0.36" | 360 m || 
|-id=482 bgcolor=#E9E9E9
| 468482 ||  || — || October 5, 2004 || Kitt Peak || Spacewatch || EUN || align=right data-sort-value="0.91" | 910 m || 
|-id=483 bgcolor=#E9E9E9
| 468483 ||  || — || October 9, 2004 || Anderson Mesa || LONEOS || JUN || align=right data-sort-value="0.90" | 900 m || 
|-id=484 bgcolor=#E9E9E9
| 468484 ||  || — || October 10, 2004 || Palomar || NEAT || — || align=right | 1.8 km || 
|-id=485 bgcolor=#E9E9E9
| 468485 ||  || — || October 4, 2004 || Palomar || NEAT || — || align=right | 2.0 km || 
|-id=486 bgcolor=#E9E9E9
| 468486 ||  || — || November 19, 2004 || Socorro || LINEAR || — || align=right | 2.0 km || 
|-id=487 bgcolor=#E9E9E9
| 468487 ||  || — || December 9, 2004 || Catalina || CSS || — || align=right | 2.6 km || 
|-id=488 bgcolor=#E9E9E9
| 468488 ||  || — || December 14, 2004 || Kitt Peak || Spacewatch || — || align=right | 2.4 km || 
|-id=489 bgcolor=#E9E9E9
| 468489 ||  || — || January 7, 2005 || Campo Imperatore || CINEOS || — || align=right | 2.9 km || 
|-id=490 bgcolor=#d6d6d6
| 468490 ||  || — || March 16, 2005 || Catalina || CSS || — || align=right | 3.0 km || 
|-id=491 bgcolor=#fefefe
| 468491 ||  || — || March 9, 2005 || Kitt Peak || Spacewatch || — || align=right data-sort-value="0.86" | 860 m || 
|-id=492 bgcolor=#d6d6d6
| 468492 ||  || — || April 5, 2005 || Mount Lemmon || Mount Lemmon Survey || — || align=right | 2.3 km || 
|-id=493 bgcolor=#fefefe
| 468493 ||  || — || April 5, 2005 || Mount Lemmon || Mount Lemmon Survey || V || align=right data-sort-value="0.53" | 530 m || 
|-id=494 bgcolor=#FA8072
| 468494 ||  || — || April 11, 2005 || Catalina || CSS || — || align=right data-sort-value="0.72" | 720 m || 
|-id=495 bgcolor=#fefefe
| 468495 ||  || — || April 10, 2005 || Kitt Peak || Spacewatch || MAS || align=right data-sort-value="0.63" | 630 m || 
|-id=496 bgcolor=#d6d6d6
| 468496 ||  || — || April 12, 2005 || Kitt Peak || Spacewatch || — || align=right | 2.1 km || 
|-id=497 bgcolor=#fefefe
| 468497 ||  || — || April 7, 2005 || Kitt Peak || Spacewatch || — || align=right data-sort-value="0.71" | 710 m || 
|-id=498 bgcolor=#fefefe
| 468498 ||  || — || May 4, 2005 || Kitt Peak || Spacewatch || MAS || align=right data-sort-value="0.64" | 640 m || 
|-id=499 bgcolor=#fefefe
| 468499 ||  || — || May 4, 2005 || Kitt Peak || Spacewatch || — || align=right data-sort-value="0.75" | 750 m || 
|-id=500 bgcolor=#d6d6d6
| 468500 ||  || — || May 6, 2005 || Kitt Peak || DLS || — || align=right | 2.7 km || 
|}

468501–468600 

|-bgcolor=#fefefe
| 468501 ||  || — || May 10, 2005 || Kitt Peak || Spacewatch || — || align=right data-sort-value="0.88" | 880 m || 
|-id=502 bgcolor=#fefefe
| 468502 ||  || — || June 6, 2005 || Kitt Peak || Spacewatch || V || align=right data-sort-value="0.53" | 530 m || 
|-id=503 bgcolor=#d6d6d6
| 468503 ||  || — || June 9, 2005 || Kitt Peak || Spacewatch || — || align=right | 3.7 km || 
|-id=504 bgcolor=#d6d6d6
| 468504 ||  || — || June 11, 2005 || Kitt Peak || Spacewatch || — || align=right | 3.0 km || 
|-id=505 bgcolor=#d6d6d6
| 468505 ||  || — || June 15, 2005 || Mount Lemmon || Mount Lemmon Survey || THB || align=right | 3.6 km || 
|-id=506 bgcolor=#d6d6d6
| 468506 ||  || — || June 29, 2005 || Kitt Peak || Spacewatch || — || align=right | 3.0 km || 
|-id=507 bgcolor=#FA8072
| 468507 ||  || — || July 4, 2005 || Socorro || LINEAR || — || align=right | 1.5 km || 
|-id=508 bgcolor=#fefefe
| 468508 ||  || — || July 3, 2005 || Mount Lemmon || Mount Lemmon Survey || — || align=right data-sort-value="0.63" | 630 m || 
|-id=509 bgcolor=#d6d6d6
| 468509 ||  || — || December 23, 2001 || Kitt Peak || Spacewatch || — || align=right | 3.7 km || 
|-id=510 bgcolor=#d6d6d6
| 468510 ||  || — || August 26, 2005 || Campo Imperatore || CINEOS || — || align=right | 2.6 km || 
|-id=511 bgcolor=#fefefe
| 468511 ||  || — || August 30, 2005 || Campo Imperatore || CINEOS || — || align=right | 1.1 km || 
|-id=512 bgcolor=#d6d6d6
| 468512 ||  || — || August 29, 2005 || Palomar || NEAT || — || align=right | 3.1 km || 
|-id=513 bgcolor=#fefefe
| 468513 ||  || — || September 1, 2005 || Kitt Peak || Spacewatch || — || align=right data-sort-value="0.86" | 860 m || 
|-id=514 bgcolor=#d6d6d6
| 468514 ||  || — || September 3, 2005 || Goodricke-Pigott || R. A. Tucker || TIR || align=right | 3.4 km || 
|-id=515 bgcolor=#fefefe
| 468515 ||  || — || September 26, 2005 || Kitt Peak || Spacewatch || NYS || align=right data-sort-value="0.63" | 630 m || 
|-id=516 bgcolor=#fefefe
| 468516 ||  || — || September 26, 2005 || Kitt Peak || Spacewatch || — || align=right data-sort-value="0.77" | 770 m || 
|-id=517 bgcolor=#d6d6d6
| 468517 ||  || — || October 2, 2005 || Palomar || NEAT || — || align=right | 3.9 km || 
|-id=518 bgcolor=#d6d6d6
| 468518 ||  || — || September 26, 2005 || Kitt Peak || Spacewatch || 7:4 || align=right | 3.3 km || 
|-id=519 bgcolor=#d6d6d6
| 468519 ||  || — || October 1, 2005 || Catalina || CSS || — || align=right | 3.6 km || 
|-id=520 bgcolor=#E9E9E9
| 468520 ||  || — || October 22, 2005 || Kitt Peak || Spacewatch || — || align=right | 1.9 km || 
|-id=521 bgcolor=#E9E9E9
| 468521 ||  || — || October 27, 2005 || Bergisch Gladbach || W. Bickel || — || align=right data-sort-value="0.88" | 880 m || 
|-id=522 bgcolor=#E9E9E9
| 468522 ||  || — || October 25, 2005 || Mount Lemmon || Mount Lemmon Survey || — || align=right data-sort-value="0.90" | 900 m || 
|-id=523 bgcolor=#E9E9E9
| 468523 ||  || — || October 27, 2005 || Kitt Peak || Spacewatch || — || align=right | 1.1 km || 
|-id=524 bgcolor=#E9E9E9
| 468524 ||  || — || October 25, 2005 || Kitt Peak || Spacewatch || JUN || align=right data-sort-value="0.83" | 830 m || 
|-id=525 bgcolor=#E9E9E9
| 468525 ||  || — || November 25, 2005 || Mount Lemmon || Mount Lemmon Survey || — || align=right | 1.6 km || 
|-id=526 bgcolor=#E9E9E9
| 468526 ||  || — || December 24, 2005 || Kitt Peak || Spacewatch || EUN || align=right | 1.1 km || 
|-id=527 bgcolor=#E9E9E9
| 468527 ||  || — || December 24, 2005 || Kitt Peak || Spacewatch || — || align=right | 1.8 km || 
|-id=528 bgcolor=#E9E9E9
| 468528 ||  || — || December 26, 2005 || Kitt Peak || Spacewatch || — || align=right | 2.2 km || 
|-id=529 bgcolor=#E9E9E9
| 468529 ||  || — || December 30, 2005 || Kitt Peak || Spacewatch || MRX || align=right data-sort-value="0.87" | 870 m || 
|-id=530 bgcolor=#E9E9E9
| 468530 ||  || — || December 30, 2005 || Kitt Peak || Spacewatch || — || align=right | 4.0 km || 
|-id=531 bgcolor=#E9E9E9
| 468531 ||  || — || December 30, 2005 || Catalina || CSS || — || align=right | 2.1 km || 
|-id=532 bgcolor=#E9E9E9
| 468532 ||  || — || January 5, 2006 || Catalina || CSS || — || align=right | 2.4 km || 
|-id=533 bgcolor=#E9E9E9
| 468533 ||  || — || January 25, 2006 || Kitt Peak || Spacewatch || — || align=right | 2.6 km || 
|-id=534 bgcolor=#E9E9E9
| 468534 ||  || — || January 27, 2006 || Mount Lemmon || Mount Lemmon Survey || — || align=right | 2.1 km || 
|-id=535 bgcolor=#E9E9E9
| 468535 ||  || — || January 31, 2006 || Kitt Peak || Spacewatch || — || align=right | 1.4 km || 
|-id=536 bgcolor=#fefefe
| 468536 ||  || — || March 4, 2006 || Kitt Peak || Spacewatch || — || align=right data-sort-value="0.69" | 690 m || 
|-id=537 bgcolor=#E9E9E9
| 468537 ||  || — || April 2, 2006 || Kitt Peak || Spacewatch || — || align=right | 2.0 km || 
|-id=538 bgcolor=#d6d6d6
| 468538 ||  || — || April 29, 2006 || Kitt Peak || Spacewatch || — || align=right | 2.3 km || 
|-id=539 bgcolor=#d6d6d6
| 468539 ||  || — || May 23, 2006 || Kitt Peak || Spacewatch || — || align=right | 4.0 km || 
|-id=540 bgcolor=#FFC2E0
| 468540 ||  || — || June 20, 2006 || Mount Lemmon || Mount Lemmon Survey || ATEcritical || align=right data-sort-value="0.47" | 470 m || 
|-id=541 bgcolor=#FFC2E0
| 468541 ||  || — || August 23, 2006 || Siding Spring || SSS || APO || align=right data-sort-value="0.34" | 340 m || 
|-id=542 bgcolor=#d6d6d6
| 468542 ||  || — || July 22, 2006 || Mount Lemmon || Mount Lemmon Survey || — || align=right | 3.5 km || 
|-id=543 bgcolor=#fefefe
| 468543 ||  || — || July 1, 2006 || Catalina || CSS || — || align=right | 1.1 km || 
|-id=544 bgcolor=#fefefe
| 468544 ||  || — || September 18, 2006 || Catalina || CSS || — || align=right data-sort-value="0.73" | 730 m || 
|-id=545 bgcolor=#d6d6d6
| 468545 ||  || — || September 19, 2006 || Kitt Peak || Spacewatch || THM || align=right | 2.6 km || 
|-id=546 bgcolor=#d6d6d6
| 468546 ||  || — || September 18, 2006 || Kitt Peak || Spacewatch || EOS || align=right | 1.9 km || 
|-id=547 bgcolor=#fefefe
| 468547 ||  || — || September 20, 2006 || Palomar || NEAT || — || align=right data-sort-value="0.74" | 740 m || 
|-id=548 bgcolor=#d6d6d6
| 468548 ||  || — || September 25, 2006 || Anderson Mesa || LONEOS || — || align=right | 3.4 km || 
|-id=549 bgcolor=#d6d6d6
| 468549 ||  || — || September 27, 2006 || Catalina || CSS || — || align=right | 3.4 km || 
|-id=550 bgcolor=#d6d6d6
| 468550 ||  || — || September 27, 2006 || Kitt Peak || Spacewatch || — || align=right | 3.4 km || 
|-id=551 bgcolor=#d6d6d6
| 468551 ||  || — || September 28, 2006 || Kitt Peak || Spacewatch || critical || align=right | 2.0 km || 
|-id=552 bgcolor=#d6d6d6
| 468552 ||  || — || September 18, 2006 || Kitt Peak || Spacewatch || THM || align=right | 2.0 km || 
|-id=553 bgcolor=#fefefe
| 468553 ||  || — || October 2, 2006 || Mount Lemmon || Mount Lemmon Survey || — || align=right data-sort-value="0.66" | 660 m || 
|-id=554 bgcolor=#d6d6d6
| 468554 ||  || — || October 12, 2006 || Kitt Peak || Spacewatch || — || align=right | 4.5 km || 
|-id=555 bgcolor=#fefefe
| 468555 ||  || — || October 17, 2006 || Mount Lemmon || Mount Lemmon Survey || — || align=right data-sort-value="0.73" | 730 m || 
|-id=556 bgcolor=#d6d6d6
| 468556 ||  || — || October 16, 2006 || Kitt Peak || Spacewatch || — || align=right | 3.1 km || 
|-id=557 bgcolor=#d6d6d6
| 468557 ||  || — || October 3, 2006 || Mount Lemmon || Mount Lemmon Survey || — || align=right | 4.5 km || 
|-id=558 bgcolor=#d6d6d6
| 468558 ||  || — || October 2, 2006 || Mount Lemmon || Mount Lemmon Survey || TIR || align=right | 2.6 km || 
|-id=559 bgcolor=#d6d6d6
| 468559 ||  || — || September 30, 2006 || Mount Lemmon || Mount Lemmon Survey || — || align=right | 2.5 km || 
|-id=560 bgcolor=#d6d6d6
| 468560 ||  || — || October 16, 2006 || Kitt Peak || Spacewatch || 7:4 || align=right | 3.9 km || 
|-id=561 bgcolor=#fefefe
| 468561 ||  || — || October 12, 2006 || Kitt Peak || Spacewatch || — || align=right data-sort-value="0.75" | 750 m || 
|-id=562 bgcolor=#d6d6d6
| 468562 ||  || — || October 20, 2006 || Mount Lemmon || Mount Lemmon Survey || — || align=right | 3.0 km || 
|-id=563 bgcolor=#fefefe
| 468563 ||  || — || November 1, 2006 || Catalina || CSS || H || align=right data-sort-value="0.74" | 740 m || 
|-id=564 bgcolor=#fefefe
| 468564 ||  || — || November 18, 2006 || Catalina || CSS || H || align=right data-sort-value="0.83" | 830 m || 
|-id=565 bgcolor=#fefefe
| 468565 ||  || — || November 2, 2006 || Catalina || CSS || H || align=right data-sort-value="0.93" | 930 m || 
|-id=566 bgcolor=#fefefe
| 468566 ||  || — || November 22, 2006 || Kitt Peak || Spacewatch || H || align=right data-sort-value="0.88" | 880 m || 
|-id=567 bgcolor=#fefefe
| 468567 ||  || — || November 24, 2006 || Mount Lemmon || Mount Lemmon Survey || H || align=right data-sort-value="0.45" | 450 m || 
|-id=568 bgcolor=#FA8072
| 468568 ||  || — || December 13, 2006 || Socorro || LINEAR || H || align=right data-sort-value="0.78" | 780 m || 
|-id=569 bgcolor=#d6d6d6
| 468569 ||  || — || December 10, 2006 || Kitt Peak || Spacewatch || — || align=right | 4.0 km || 
|-id=570 bgcolor=#E9E9E9
| 468570 ||  || — || December 21, 2006 || Kitt Peak || Spacewatch || — || align=right data-sort-value="0.91" | 910 m || 
|-id=571 bgcolor=#E9E9E9
| 468571 ||  || — || February 21, 2007 || Kitt Peak || Spacewatch || — || align=right | 1.1 km || 
|-id=572 bgcolor=#E9E9E9
| 468572 ||  || — || January 28, 2007 || Mount Lemmon || Mount Lemmon Survey || — || align=right | 1.9 km || 
|-id=573 bgcolor=#E9E9E9
| 468573 ||  || — || February 26, 2007 || Mount Lemmon || Mount Lemmon Survey || — || align=right | 1.2 km || 
|-id=574 bgcolor=#E9E9E9
| 468574 ||  || — || March 12, 2007 || Kitt Peak || Spacewatch || MAR || align=right | 1.1 km || 
|-id=575 bgcolor=#E9E9E9
| 468575 ||  || — || February 8, 2007 || Kitt Peak || Spacewatch || — || align=right | 1.4 km || 
|-id=576 bgcolor=#E9E9E9
| 468576 ||  || — || March 12, 2007 || Catalina || CSS || — || align=right | 1.8 km || 
|-id=577 bgcolor=#E9E9E9
| 468577 ||  || — || March 13, 2007 || Mount Lemmon || Mount Lemmon Survey || — || align=right | 1.6 km || 
|-id=578 bgcolor=#E9E9E9
| 468578 ||  || — || April 23, 2007 || Catalina || CSS || — || align=right | 2.7 km || 
|-id=579 bgcolor=#E9E9E9
| 468579 ||  || — || April 24, 2007 || Kitt Peak || Spacewatch || — || align=right | 2.0 km || 
|-id=580 bgcolor=#E9E9E9
| 468580 ||  || — || April 15, 2007 || Catalina || CSS || — || align=right | 2.1 km || 
|-id=581 bgcolor=#E9E9E9
| 468581 ||  || — || May 11, 2007 || Lulin Observatory || LUSS || — || align=right | 1.7 km || 
|-id=582 bgcolor=#E9E9E9
| 468582 ||  || — || May 13, 2007 || Mount Lemmon || Mount Lemmon Survey || MIS || align=right | 2.5 km || 
|-id=583 bgcolor=#FFC2E0
| 468583 ||  || — || June 8, 2007 || Kitt Peak || Spacewatch || APO +1kmcritical || align=right data-sort-value="0.93" | 930 m || 
|-id=584 bgcolor=#E9E9E9
| 468584 ||  || — || May 26, 2007 || Mount Lemmon || Mount Lemmon Survey || — || align=right | 1.3 km || 
|-id=585 bgcolor=#E9E9E9
| 468585 ||  || — || June 14, 2007 || Kitt Peak || Spacewatch || — || align=right | 2.5 km || 
|-id=586 bgcolor=#d6d6d6
| 468586 ||  || — || September 9, 2007 || Mount Lemmon || Mount Lemmon Survey || EOS || align=right | 1.5 km || 
|-id=587 bgcolor=#E9E9E9
| 468587 ||  || — || September 4, 2007 || Catalina || CSS || — || align=right | 2.7 km || 
|-id=588 bgcolor=#E9E9E9
| 468588 ||  || — || June 15, 2007 || Kitt Peak || Spacewatch ||  || align=right | 2.6 km || 
|-id=589 bgcolor=#d6d6d6
| 468589 ||  || — || September 15, 2007 || Kitt Peak || Spacewatch || — || align=right | 2.9 km || 
|-id=590 bgcolor=#d6d6d6
| 468590 ||  || — || September 10, 2007 || Mount Lemmon || Mount Lemmon Survey || — || align=right | 2.5 km || 
|-id=591 bgcolor=#d6d6d6
| 468591 ||  || — || September 12, 2007 || Mount Lemmon || Mount Lemmon Survey || — || align=right | 2.2 km || 
|-id=592 bgcolor=#d6d6d6
| 468592 ||  || — || October 7, 2007 || Mount Lemmon || Mount Lemmon Survey || EOS || align=right | 1.4 km || 
|-id=593 bgcolor=#fefefe
| 468593 ||  || — || October 12, 2007 || Kitt Peak || Spacewatch || — || align=right data-sort-value="0.66" | 660 m || 
|-id=594 bgcolor=#d6d6d6
| 468594 ||  || — || October 11, 2007 || Goodricke-Pigott || R. A. Tucker || — || align=right | 3.4 km || 
|-id=595 bgcolor=#E9E9E9
| 468595 ||  || — || October 15, 2007 || Kitt Peak || Spacewatch || — || align=right | 2.4 km || 
|-id=596 bgcolor=#fefefe
| 468596 ||  || — || October 16, 2007 || Kitt Peak || Spacewatch || — || align=right data-sort-value="0.59" | 590 m || 
|-id=597 bgcolor=#d6d6d6
| 468597 ||  || — || October 21, 2007 || Kitt Peak || Spacewatch || EMA || align=right | 2.7 km || 
|-id=598 bgcolor=#d6d6d6
| 468598 ||  || — || April 11, 2005 || Mount Lemmon || Mount Lemmon Survey || — || align=right | 2.4 km || 
|-id=599 bgcolor=#d6d6d6
| 468599 ||  || — || October 30, 2007 || Mount Lemmon || Mount Lemmon Survey || — || align=right | 2.8 km || 
|-id=600 bgcolor=#d6d6d6
| 468600 ||  || — || October 19, 2007 || Socorro || LINEAR || — || align=right | 3.8 km || 
|}

468601–468700 

|-bgcolor=#fefefe
| 468601 ||  || — || October 9, 2007 || Catalina || CSS || — || align=right | 1.2 km || 
|-id=602 bgcolor=#d6d6d6
| 468602 ||  || — || September 15, 2007 || Mount Lemmon || Mount Lemmon Survey || — || align=right | 3.9 km || 
|-id=603 bgcolor=#d6d6d6
| 468603 ||  || — || November 5, 2007 || Kitt Peak || Spacewatch || — || align=right | 4.7 km || 
|-id=604 bgcolor=#d6d6d6
| 468604 ||  || — || November 14, 2007 || Kitt Peak || Spacewatch || — || align=right | 3.0 km || 
|-id=605 bgcolor=#d6d6d6
| 468605 ||  || — || September 26, 2006 || Kitt Peak || Spacewatch || EOS || align=right | 1.7 km || 
|-id=606 bgcolor=#E9E9E9
| 468606 ||  || — || November 9, 2007 || Socorro || LINEAR || — || align=right | 3.9 km || 
|-id=607 bgcolor=#fefefe
| 468607 ||  || — || November 15, 2007 || Catalina || CSS || — || align=right | 1.1 km || 
|-id=608 bgcolor=#d6d6d6
| 468608 ||  || — || November 17, 2007 || Catalina || CSS || — || align=right | 3.2 km || 
|-id=609 bgcolor=#fefefe
| 468609 ||  || — || November 8, 2007 || Catalina || CSS || — || align=right data-sort-value="0.98" | 980 m || 
|-id=610 bgcolor=#d6d6d6
| 468610 ||  || — || November 11, 2007 || Mount Lemmon || Mount Lemmon Survey || EOS || align=right | 1.8 km || 
|-id=611 bgcolor=#FA8072
| 468611 ||  || — || December 28, 2007 || Kitt Peak || Spacewatch || H || align=right data-sort-value="0.60" | 600 m || 
|-id=612 bgcolor=#fefefe
| 468612 ||  || — || December 30, 2007 || Mount Lemmon || Mount Lemmon Survey || — || align=right data-sort-value="0.66" | 660 m || 
|-id=613 bgcolor=#fefefe
| 468613 ||  || — || December 28, 2007 || Kitt Peak || Spacewatch || V || align=right data-sort-value="0.56" | 560 m || 
|-id=614 bgcolor=#fefefe
| 468614 ||  || — || December 15, 2007 || Kitt Peak || Spacewatch || — || align=right data-sort-value="0.62" | 620 m || 
|-id=615 bgcolor=#FA8072
| 468615 ||  || — || December 31, 2007 || Kitt Peak || Spacewatch || H || align=right data-sort-value="0.67" | 670 m || 
|-id=616 bgcolor=#fefefe
| 468616 ||  || — || February 10, 2008 || Mount Lemmon || Mount Lemmon Survey || — || align=right data-sort-value="0.77" | 770 m || 
|-id=617 bgcolor=#fefefe
| 468617 ||  || — || February 28, 2008 || Kitt Peak || Spacewatch || — || align=right data-sort-value="0.62" | 620 m || 
|-id=618 bgcolor=#fefefe
| 468618 ||  || — || March 10, 2008 || Kitt Peak || Spacewatch || MAS || align=right data-sort-value="0.61" | 610 m || 
|-id=619 bgcolor=#fefefe
| 468619 ||  || — || March 1, 2008 || Socorro || LINEAR || — || align=right data-sort-value="0.85" | 850 m || 
|-id=620 bgcolor=#fefefe
| 468620 ||  || — || March 1, 2008 || Kitt Peak || Spacewatch || — || align=right data-sort-value="0.69" | 690 m || 
|-id=621 bgcolor=#fefefe
| 468621 ||  || — || March 28, 2008 || Mount Lemmon || Mount Lemmon Survey || — || align=right data-sort-value="0.70" | 700 m || 
|-id=622 bgcolor=#fefefe
| 468622 ||  || — || February 12, 2008 || Kitt Peak || Spacewatch || MAS || align=right data-sort-value="0.67" | 670 m || 
|-id=623 bgcolor=#E9E9E9
| 468623 ||  || — || April 9, 2008 || Socorro || LINEAR || — || align=right | 2.0 km || 
|-id=624 bgcolor=#E9E9E9
| 468624 ||  || — || April 24, 2008 || Kitt Peak || Spacewatch || — || align=right | 1.0 km || 
|-id=625 bgcolor=#fefefe
| 468625 ||  || — || April 26, 2008 || Mount Lemmon || Mount Lemmon Survey || — || align=right data-sort-value="0.81" | 810 m || 
|-id=626 bgcolor=#E9E9E9
| 468626 ||  || — || April 30, 2008 || Mount Lemmon || Mount Lemmon Survey || — || align=right data-sort-value="0.76" | 760 m || 
|-id=627 bgcolor=#E9E9E9
| 468627 ||  || — || July 29, 2008 || Kitt Peak || Spacewatch || ADE || align=right | 1.7 km || 
|-id=628 bgcolor=#E9E9E9
| 468628 ||  || — || July 30, 2008 || Kitt Peak || Spacewatch || — || align=right | 1.6 km || 
|-id=629 bgcolor=#E9E9E9
| 468629 ||  || — || August 5, 2008 || La Sagra || OAM Obs. || — || align=right data-sort-value="0.85" | 850 m || 
|-id=630 bgcolor=#E9E9E9
| 468630 ||  || — || September 2, 2008 || Kitt Peak || Spacewatch || — || align=right | 1.3 km || 
|-id=631 bgcolor=#E9E9E9
| 468631 ||  || — || September 2, 2008 || Kitt Peak || Spacewatch || — || align=right data-sort-value="0.93" | 930 m || 
|-id=632 bgcolor=#E9E9E9
| 468632 ||  || — || September 13, 2008 || La Cañada || J. Lacruz || — || align=right | 1.9 km || 
|-id=633 bgcolor=#E9E9E9
| 468633 ||  || — || August 22, 2008 || Kitt Peak || Spacewatch || — || align=right | 1.5 km || 
|-id=634 bgcolor=#E9E9E9
| 468634 ||  || — || September 23, 2008 || Catalina || CSS || — || align=right | 2.4 km || 
|-id=635 bgcolor=#E9E9E9
| 468635 ||  || — || September 20, 2008 || Kitt Peak || Spacewatch || — || align=right | 1.2 km || 
|-id=636 bgcolor=#E9E9E9
| 468636 ||  || — || September 9, 2008 || Mount Lemmon || Mount Lemmon Survey || — || align=right | 2.1 km || 
|-id=637 bgcolor=#E9E9E9
| 468637 ||  || — || September 21, 2008 || Kitt Peak || Spacewatch || critical || align=right data-sort-value="0.65" | 650 m || 
|-id=638 bgcolor=#E9E9E9
| 468638 ||  || — || September 9, 2008 || Mount Lemmon || Mount Lemmon Survey || — || align=right | 2.4 km || 
|-id=639 bgcolor=#C2FFFF
| 468639 ||  || — || September 28, 2008 || Mount Lemmon || Mount Lemmon Survey || L4 || align=right | 7.0 km || 
|-id=640 bgcolor=#E9E9E9
| 468640 ||  || — || September 20, 2008 || Mount Lemmon || Mount Lemmon Survey || — || align=right | 2.8 km || 
|-id=641 bgcolor=#E9E9E9
| 468641 ||  || — || September 22, 2008 || Catalina || CSS || — || align=right | 1.5 km || 
|-id=642 bgcolor=#E9E9E9
| 468642 ||  || — || September 7, 2008 || Catalina || CSS || — || align=right | 2.0 km || 
|-id=643 bgcolor=#E9E9E9
| 468643 ||  || — || October 1, 2008 || Mount Lemmon || Mount Lemmon Survey || — || align=right | 2.9 km || 
|-id=644 bgcolor=#E9E9E9
| 468644 ||  || — || September 2, 2008 || Kitt Peak || Spacewatch || — || align=right | 1.4 km || 
|-id=645 bgcolor=#d6d6d6
| 468645 ||  || — || October 8, 2008 || Kitt Peak || Spacewatch || — || align=right | 2.6 km || 
|-id=646 bgcolor=#E9E9E9
| 468646 ||  || — || September 2, 2008 || Kitt Peak || Spacewatch || — || align=right | 2.0 km || 
|-id=647 bgcolor=#FA8072
| 468647 ||  || — || October 23, 2008 || Socorro || LINEAR || — || align=right | 2.1 km || 
|-id=648 bgcolor=#E9E9E9
| 468648 ||  || — || October 20, 2008 || Kitt Peak || Spacewatch || GEF || align=right data-sort-value="0.91" | 910 m || 
|-id=649 bgcolor=#E9E9E9
| 468649 ||  || — || October 20, 2008 || Kitt Peak || Spacewatch || — || align=right | 2.5 km || 
|-id=650 bgcolor=#E9E9E9
| 468650 ||  || — || September 3, 2008 || Kitt Peak || Spacewatch || — || align=right | 1.9 km || 
|-id=651 bgcolor=#E9E9E9
| 468651 ||  || — || October 24, 2008 || Kitt Peak || Spacewatch || — || align=right | 1.3 km || 
|-id=652 bgcolor=#E9E9E9
| 468652 ||  || — || September 26, 2008 || Kitt Peak || Spacewatch || — || align=right | 1.5 km || 
|-id=653 bgcolor=#E9E9E9
| 468653 ||  || — || October 24, 2008 || Kitt Peak || Spacewatch || — || align=right | 2.0 km || 
|-id=654 bgcolor=#E9E9E9
| 468654 ||  || — || October 24, 2008 || Catalina || CSS || — || align=right | 2.1 km || 
|-id=655 bgcolor=#E9E9E9
| 468655 ||  || — || October 25, 2008 || Catalina || CSS || — || align=right | 1.9 km || 
|-id=656 bgcolor=#d6d6d6
| 468656 ||  || — || October 29, 2008 || Mount Lemmon || Mount Lemmon Survey || — || align=right | 2.5 km || 
|-id=657 bgcolor=#E9E9E9
| 468657 ||  || — || October 9, 2008 || Socorro || LINEAR || — || align=right | 3.9 km || 
|-id=658 bgcolor=#E9E9E9
| 468658 ||  || — || November 2, 2008 || Mount Lemmon || Mount Lemmon Survey || — || align=right | 1.3 km || 
|-id=659 bgcolor=#E9E9E9
| 468659 ||  || — || November 2, 2008 || Socorro || LINEAR || — || align=right | 2.3 km || 
|-id=660 bgcolor=#d6d6d6
| 468660 ||  || — || November 20, 2008 || Kitt Peak || Spacewatch || — || align=right | 2.4 km || 
|-id=661 bgcolor=#E9E9E9
| 468661 ||  || — || November 21, 2008 || Mount Lemmon || Mount Lemmon Survey || AGN || align=right | 1.1 km || 
|-id=662 bgcolor=#E9E9E9
| 468662 ||  || — || October 22, 2008 || Kitt Peak || Spacewatch || — || align=right | 1.6 km || 
|-id=663 bgcolor=#d6d6d6
| 468663 ||  || — || November 19, 2008 || Kitt Peak || Spacewatch || — || align=right | 2.8 km || 
|-id=664 bgcolor=#d6d6d6
| 468664 ||  || — || November 19, 2008 || Kitt Peak || Spacewatch || EOS || align=right | 1.7 km || 
|-id=665 bgcolor=#d6d6d6
| 468665 ||  || — || October 29, 2008 || Kitt Peak || Spacewatch || — || align=right | 2.6 km || 
|-id=666 bgcolor=#d6d6d6
| 468666 ||  || — || December 29, 2008 || Mount Lemmon || Mount Lemmon Survey || EOS || align=right | 1.6 km || 
|-id=667 bgcolor=#E9E9E9
| 468667 ||  || — || October 26, 2008 || Mount Lemmon || Mount Lemmon Survey || — || align=right | 3.7 km || 
|-id=668 bgcolor=#d6d6d6
| 468668 ||  || — || December 22, 2008 || Kitt Peak || Spacewatch || — || align=right | 2.8 km || 
|-id=669 bgcolor=#d6d6d6
| 468669 ||  || — || November 21, 2008 || Mount Lemmon || Mount Lemmon Survey || — || align=right | 3.4 km || 
|-id=670 bgcolor=#d6d6d6
| 468670 ||  || — || January 15, 2009 || Kitt Peak || Spacewatch || — || align=right | 2.0 km || 
|-id=671 bgcolor=#d6d6d6
| 468671 ||  || — || November 3, 2008 || Kitt Peak || Spacewatch || — || align=right | 3.6 km || 
|-id=672 bgcolor=#d6d6d6
| 468672 ||  || — || December 22, 2008 || Kitt Peak || Spacewatch || — || align=right | 2.9 km || 
|-id=673 bgcolor=#d6d6d6
| 468673 ||  || — || January 29, 2009 || Mount Lemmon || Mount Lemmon Survey || — || align=right | 2.5 km || 
|-id=674 bgcolor=#d6d6d6
| 468674 ||  || — || February 3, 2009 || Kitt Peak || Spacewatch || — || align=right | 3.0 km || 
|-id=675 bgcolor=#d6d6d6
| 468675 ||  || — || February 17, 2009 || Calar Alto || F. Hormuth || EOS || align=right | 1.5 km || 
|-id=676 bgcolor=#fefefe
| 468676 ||  || — || February 19, 2009 || Kitt Peak || Spacewatch || — || align=right data-sort-value="0.83" | 830 m || 
|-id=677 bgcolor=#d6d6d6
| 468677 ||  || — || September 25, 2006 || Mount Lemmon || Mount Lemmon Survey || EOS || align=right | 2.1 km || 
|-id=678 bgcolor=#fefefe
| 468678 ||  || — || May 26, 2009 || Catalina || CSS || — || align=right data-sort-value="0.71" | 710 m || 
|-id=679 bgcolor=#fefefe
| 468679 ||  || — || May 1, 2009 || Mount Lemmon || Mount Lemmon Survey || — || align=right data-sort-value="0.78" | 780 m || 
|-id=680 bgcolor=#fefefe
| 468680 ||  || — || June 22, 2009 || Mount Lemmon || Mount Lemmon Survey || NYS || align=right data-sort-value="0.62" | 620 m || 
|-id=681 bgcolor=#FFC2E0
| 468681 ||  || — || June 25, 2009 || Purple Mountain || PMO NEO || AMOcritical || align=right data-sort-value="0.28" | 280 m || 
|-id=682 bgcolor=#fefefe
| 468682 ||  || — || July 28, 2009 || Kitt Peak || Spacewatch || — || align=right data-sort-value="0.76" | 760 m || 
|-id=683 bgcolor=#fefefe
| 468683 ||  || — || June 24, 2009 || Mount Lemmon || Mount Lemmon Survey || NYS || align=right data-sort-value="0.63" | 630 m || 
|-id=684 bgcolor=#FFC2E0
| 468684 ||  || — || August 27, 2009 || La Sagra || OAM Obs. || AMO || align=right data-sort-value="0.41" | 410 m || 
|-id=685 bgcolor=#fefefe
| 468685 ||  || — || August 29, 2009 || Kitt Peak || Spacewatch || — || align=right data-sort-value="0.64" | 640 m || 
|-id=686 bgcolor=#fefefe
| 468686 ||  || — || September 12, 2009 || Kitt Peak || Spacewatch || — || align=right data-sort-value="0.65" | 650 m || 
|-id=687 bgcolor=#fefefe
| 468687 ||  || — || December 13, 1999 || Catalina || CSS || H || align=right data-sort-value="0.78" | 780 m || 
|-id=688 bgcolor=#fefefe
| 468688 ||  || — || October 7, 2005 || Catalina || CSS || — || align=right data-sort-value="0.75" | 750 m || 
|-id=689 bgcolor=#fefefe
| 468689 ||  || — || September 23, 2009 || Kitt Peak || Spacewatch || — || align=right data-sort-value="0.71" | 710 m || 
|-id=690 bgcolor=#E9E9E9
| 468690 ||  || — || September 24, 2009 || Kitt Peak || Spacewatch || — || align=right | 1.2 km || 
|-id=691 bgcolor=#E9E9E9
| 468691 ||  || — || September 29, 2009 || Mount Lemmon || Mount Lemmon Survey || — || align=right | 1.2 km || 
|-id=692 bgcolor=#E9E9E9
| 468692 ||  || — || September 21, 2009 || Kitt Peak || Spacewatch || — || align=right data-sort-value="0.76" | 760 m || 
|-id=693 bgcolor=#E9E9E9
| 468693 ||  || — || March 19, 2007 || Mount Lemmon || Mount Lemmon Survey || — || align=right | 2.8 km || 
|-id=694 bgcolor=#C2FFFF
| 468694 ||  || — || September 12, 2009 || Kitt Peak || Spacewatch || L4 || align=right | 8.0 km || 
|-id=695 bgcolor=#E9E9E9
| 468695 ||  || — || October 23, 2009 || Kitt Peak || Spacewatch || — || align=right | 2.5 km || 
|-id=696 bgcolor=#fefefe
| 468696 ||  || — || November 8, 2009 || Mount Lemmon || Mount Lemmon Survey || — || align=right data-sort-value="0.87" | 870 m || 
|-id=697 bgcolor=#E9E9E9
| 468697 ||  || — || November 9, 2009 || Kitt Peak || Spacewatch || — || align=right | 1.8 km || 
|-id=698 bgcolor=#E9E9E9
| 468698 ||  || — || November 17, 2009 || Catalina || CSS || — || align=right | 2.9 km || 
|-id=699 bgcolor=#E9E9E9
| 468699 ||  || — || November 18, 2009 || Kitt Peak || Spacewatch || — || align=right | 1.8 km || 
|-id=700 bgcolor=#C2FFFF
| 468700 ||  || — || August 10, 2007 || Kitt Peak || Spacewatch || L4 || align=right | 6.5 km || 
|}

468701–468800 

|-bgcolor=#E9E9E9
| 468701 ||  || — || January 18, 2008 || Kitt Peak || Spacewatch || — || align=right | 2.1 km || 
|-id=702 bgcolor=#E9E9E9
| 468702 ||  || — || November 19, 2009 || Catalina || CSS || — || align=right | 4.4 km || 
|-id=703 bgcolor=#E9E9E9
| 468703 ||  || — || December 20, 2009 || Kitt Peak || Spacewatch || ADE || align=right | 2.2 km || 
|-id=704 bgcolor=#E9E9E9
| 468704 ||  || — || January 6, 2010 || Kitt Peak || Spacewatch || — || align=right | 1.7 km || 
|-id=705 bgcolor=#d6d6d6
| 468705 ||  || — || January 16, 2010 || WISE || WISE || Tj (2.98) || align=right | 2.4 km || 
|-id=706 bgcolor=#d6d6d6
| 468706 ||  || — || January 18, 2010 || WISE || WISE || — || align=right | 3.9 km || 
|-id=707 bgcolor=#d6d6d6
| 468707 ||  || — || January 25, 2010 || WISE || WISE || — || align=right | 3.3 km || 
|-id=708 bgcolor=#d6d6d6
| 468708 ||  || — || January 27, 2010 || WISE || WISE || — || align=right | 3.6 km || 
|-id=709 bgcolor=#fefefe
| 468709 ||  || — || January 8, 2010 || Catalina || CSS || H || align=right data-sort-value="0.76" | 760 m || 
|-id=710 bgcolor=#d6d6d6
| 468710 ||  || — || February 10, 2010 || WISE || WISE || — || align=right | 4.3 km || 
|-id=711 bgcolor=#E9E9E9
| 468711 ||  || — || December 19, 2009 || Mount Lemmon || Mount Lemmon Survey || — || align=right | 2.5 km || 
|-id=712 bgcolor=#d6d6d6
| 468712 ||  || — || February 3, 2010 || WISE || WISE || — || align=right | 3.1 km || 
|-id=713 bgcolor=#d6d6d6
| 468713 ||  || — || February 16, 2010 || Mount Lemmon || Mount Lemmon Survey || — || align=right | 1.6 km || 
|-id=714 bgcolor=#d6d6d6
| 468714 ||  || — || February 17, 2010 || Kitt Peak || Spacewatch || — || align=right | 2.7 km || 
|-id=715 bgcolor=#d6d6d6
| 468715 ||  || — || February 21, 2010 || WISE || WISE || — || align=right | 4.1 km || 
|-id=716 bgcolor=#d6d6d6
| 468716 ||  || — || October 23, 2008 || Kitt Peak || Spacewatch || — || align=right | 2.3 km || 
|-id=717 bgcolor=#d6d6d6
| 468717 ||  || — || March 12, 2010 || Mount Lemmon || Mount Lemmon Survey || THM || align=right | 2.0 km || 
|-id=718 bgcolor=#d6d6d6
| 468718 ||  || — || March 14, 2010 || Mount Lemmon || Mount Lemmon Survey || — || align=right | 2.6 km || 
|-id=719 bgcolor=#d6d6d6
| 468719 ||  || — || March 4, 2010 || Kitt Peak || Spacewatch || — || align=right | 1.9 km || 
|-id=720 bgcolor=#d6d6d6
| 468720 ||  || — || September 11, 2007 || Kitt Peak || Spacewatch || — || align=right | 2.2 km || 
|-id=721 bgcolor=#d6d6d6
| 468721 ||  || — || March 19, 2010 || Kitt Peak || Spacewatch || — || align=right | 2.7 km || 
|-id=722 bgcolor=#d6d6d6
| 468722 ||  || — || March 18, 2010 || Kitt Peak || Spacewatch || LIX || align=right | 2.5 km || 
|-id=723 bgcolor=#d6d6d6
| 468723 ||  || — || April 5, 2010 || WISE || WISE || — || align=right | 5.5 km || 
|-id=724 bgcolor=#d6d6d6
| 468724 ||  || — || April 4, 2010 || Kitt Peak || Spacewatch || — || align=right | 2.3 km || 
|-id=725 bgcolor=#d6d6d6
| 468725 Khalat ||  ||  || May 5, 2010 || Zelenchukskaya || T. V. Kryachko || — || align=right | 3.7 km || 
|-id=726 bgcolor=#d6d6d6
| 468726 ||  || — || January 13, 2010 || WISE || WISE || — || align=right | 2.7 km || 
|-id=727 bgcolor=#FFC2E0
| 468727 ||  || — || May 10, 2010 || WISE || WISE || ATEPHA || align=right data-sort-value="0.31" | 310 m || 
|-id=728 bgcolor=#d6d6d6
| 468728 ||  || — || June 1, 2010 || WISE || WISE || — || align=right | 3.4 km || 
|-id=729 bgcolor=#d6d6d6
| 468729 ||  || — || May 4, 2005 || Catalina || CSS || — || align=right | 4.5 km || 
|-id=730 bgcolor=#FFC2E0
| 468730 ||  || — || June 23, 2010 || Mount Lemmon || Mount Lemmon Survey || AMO || align=right data-sort-value="0.72" | 720 m || 
|-id=731 bgcolor=#fefefe
| 468731 ||  || — || December 1, 2003 || Socorro || LINEAR || — || align=right | 1.3 km || 
|-id=732 bgcolor=#fefefe
| 468732 ||  || — || October 11, 2007 || Kitt Peak || Spacewatch || — || align=right data-sort-value="0.64" | 640 m || 
|-id=733 bgcolor=#fefefe
| 468733 ||  || — || October 15, 2007 || Mount Lemmon || Mount Lemmon Survey || — || align=right data-sort-value="0.61" | 610 m || 
|-id=734 bgcolor=#fefefe
| 468734 ||  || — || September 29, 2010 || Kitt Peak || Spacewatch || — || align=right data-sort-value="0.60" | 600 m || 
|-id=735 bgcolor=#fefefe
| 468735 ||  || — || October 20, 2007 || Kitt Peak || Spacewatch || — || align=right data-sort-value="0.62" | 620 m || 
|-id=736 bgcolor=#fefefe
| 468736 ||  || — || October 1, 2010 || Mount Lemmon || Mount Lemmon Survey || — || align=right data-sort-value="0.73" | 730 m || 
|-id=737 bgcolor=#fefefe
| 468737 ||  || — || October 2, 2010 || Kitt Peak || Spacewatch || — || align=right data-sort-value="0.74" | 740 m || 
|-id=738 bgcolor=#FFC2E0
| 468738 ||  || — || November 20, 2007 || Mount Lemmon || Mount Lemmon Survey || AMO || align=right data-sort-value="0.51" | 510 m || 
|-id=739 bgcolor=#FA8072
| 468739 ||  || — || October 30, 2010 || Kitt Peak || Spacewatch || — || align=right data-sort-value="0.72" | 720 m || 
|-id=740 bgcolor=#fefefe
| 468740 ||  || — || October 28, 2010 || Mount Lemmon || Mount Lemmon Survey || — || align=right data-sort-value="0.63" | 630 m || 
|-id=741 bgcolor=#FFC2E0
| 468741 ||  || — || November 2, 2010 || Haleakala || Pan-STARRS || AMO || align=right data-sort-value="0.34" | 340 m || 
|-id=742 bgcolor=#fefefe
| 468742 ||  || — || April 19, 2006 || Mount Lemmon || Mount Lemmon Survey || — || align=right data-sort-value="0.56" | 560 m || 
|-id=743 bgcolor=#fefefe
| 468743 ||  || — || September 27, 2006 || Mount Lemmon || Mount Lemmon Survey || — || align=right data-sort-value="0.85" | 850 m || 
|-id=744 bgcolor=#E9E9E9
| 468744 ||  || — || March 10, 2007 || Kitt Peak || Spacewatch || — || align=right | 1.3 km || 
|-id=745 bgcolor=#E9E9E9
| 468745 ||  || — || December 21, 2006 || Mount Lemmon || Mount Lemmon Survey || — || align=right | 1.2 km || 
|-id=746 bgcolor=#E9E9E9
| 468746 ||  || — || January 10, 2011 || Kitt Peak || Spacewatch || MAR || align=right data-sort-value="0.97" | 970 m || 
|-id=747 bgcolor=#E9E9E9
| 468747 ||  || — || January 10, 2011 || Kitt Peak || Spacewatch || — || align=right | 1.4 km || 
|-id=748 bgcolor=#E9E9E9
| 468748 ||  || — || January 11, 2002 || Kitt Peak || Spacewatch || — || align=right | 2.2 km || 
|-id=749 bgcolor=#E9E9E9
| 468749 ||  || — || December 4, 2005 || Kitt Peak || Spacewatch || — || align=right | 2.2 km || 
|-id=750 bgcolor=#E9E9E9
| 468750 ||  || — || January 14, 2011 || Kitt Peak || Spacewatch || EUN || align=right | 1.1 km || 
|-id=751 bgcolor=#E9E9E9
| 468751 ||  || — || November 16, 2010 || Mount Lemmon || Mount Lemmon Survey || JUN || align=right | 1.2 km || 
|-id=752 bgcolor=#E9E9E9
| 468752 ||  || — || July 29, 2008 || Kitt Peak || Spacewatch || — || align=right | 2.5 km || 
|-id=753 bgcolor=#E9E9E9
| 468753 ||  || — || April 18, 2007 || Kitt Peak || Spacewatch || — || align=right | 1.5 km || 
|-id=754 bgcolor=#E9E9E9
| 468754 ||  || — || November 26, 2009 || Mount Lemmon || Mount Lemmon Survey || — || align=right | 1.7 km || 
|-id=755 bgcolor=#E9E9E9
| 468755 ||  || — || March 28, 2011 || Kitt Peak || Spacewatch || — || align=right | 1.8 km || 
|-id=756 bgcolor=#E9E9E9
| 468756 ||  || — || January 23, 2006 || Kitt Peak || Spacewatch || — || align=right | 1.8 km || 
|-id=757 bgcolor=#E9E9E9
| 468757 ||  || — || March 29, 2011 || Catalina || CSS || EUN || align=right | 1.5 km || 
|-id=758 bgcolor=#E9E9E9
| 468758 ||  || — || January 28, 2011 || Mount Lemmon || Mount Lemmon Survey || — || align=right | 1.9 km || 
|-id=759 bgcolor=#E9E9E9
| 468759 ||  || — || March 13, 2011 || Mount Lemmon || Mount Lemmon Survey || DOR || align=right | 2.0 km || 
|-id=760 bgcolor=#d6d6d6
| 468760 ||  || — || April 13, 2011 || Mount Lemmon || Mount Lemmon Survey || — || align=right | 3.3 km || 
|-id=761 bgcolor=#E9E9E9
| 468761 ||  || — || April 19, 2007 || Mount Lemmon || Mount Lemmon Survey || — || align=right | 1.3 km || 
|-id=762 bgcolor=#d6d6d6
| 468762 ||  || — || April 27, 2000 || Anderson Mesa || LONEOS || — || align=right | 3.1 km || 
|-id=763 bgcolor=#d6d6d6
| 468763 ||  || — || March 1, 2005 || Catalina || CSS || — || align=right | 3.2 km || 
|-id=764 bgcolor=#fefefe
| 468764 ||  || — || June 3, 2011 || Mount Lemmon || Mount Lemmon Survey || H || align=right data-sort-value="0.98" | 980 m || 
|-id=765 bgcolor=#fefefe
| 468765 ||  || — || January 16, 2005 || Kitt Peak || Spacewatch || H || align=right data-sort-value="0.68" | 680 m || 
|-id=766 bgcolor=#FA8072
| 468766 ||  || — || June 21, 2011 || Kitt Peak || Spacewatch || H || align=right data-sort-value="0.60" | 600 m || 
|-id=767 bgcolor=#d6d6d6
| 468767 ||  || — || June 8, 2005 || Kitt Peak || Spacewatch || — || align=right | 3.0 km || 
|-id=768 bgcolor=#d6d6d6
| 468768 ||  || — || May 8, 2005 || Kitt Peak || Spacewatch || — || align=right | 2.3 km || 
|-id=769 bgcolor=#d6d6d6
| 468769 ||  || — || June 29, 2011 || Kitt Peak || Spacewatch || — || align=right | 2.5 km || 
|-id=770 bgcolor=#d6d6d6
| 468770 ||  || — || September 17, 2006 || Catalina || CSS || — || align=right | 5.2 km || 
|-id=771 bgcolor=#d6d6d6
| 468771 ||  || — || September 17, 2006 || Kitt Peak || Spacewatch || EOS || align=right | 1.6 km || 
|-id=772 bgcolor=#d6d6d6
| 468772 ||  || — || September 29, 2011 || Mount Lemmon || Mount Lemmon Survey || — || align=right | 2.9 km || 
|-id=773 bgcolor=#d6d6d6
| 468773 ||  || — || November 10, 2006 || Kitt Peak || Spacewatch || — || align=right | 3.5 km || 
|-id=774 bgcolor=#d6d6d6
| 468774 ||  || — || November 10, 2006 || Kitt Peak || Spacewatch || THB || align=right | 3.7 km || 
|-id=775 bgcolor=#d6d6d6
| 468775 ||  || — || September 26, 2005 || Catalina || CSS || — || align=right | 3.2 km || 
|-id=776 bgcolor=#fefefe
| 468776 ||  || — || September 28, 2006 || Mount Lemmon || Mount Lemmon Survey || H || align=right data-sort-value="0.71" | 710 m || 
|-id=777 bgcolor=#fefefe
| 468777 ||  || — || January 17, 2005 || Catalina || CSS || — || align=right | 1.1 km || 
|-id=778 bgcolor=#C2FFFF
| 468778 ||  || — || December 2, 2010 || Mount Lemmon || Mount Lemmon Survey || L4 || align=right | 8.1 km || 
|-id=779 bgcolor=#fefefe
| 468779 ||  || — || January 25, 2009 || Kitt Peak || Spacewatch || — || align=right data-sort-value="0.81" | 810 m || 
|-id=780 bgcolor=#C2FFFF
| 468780 ||  || — || October 24, 2011 || Mount Lemmon || Mount Lemmon Survey || L4 || align=right | 8.7 km || 
|-id=781 bgcolor=#C2FFFF
| 468781 ||  || — || December 31, 2011 || Mount Lemmon || Mount Lemmon Survey || L4 || align=right | 14 km || 
|-id=782 bgcolor=#C2FFFF
| 468782 ||  || — || January 19, 2010 || WISE || WISE || L4 || align=right | 8.3 km || 
|-id=783 bgcolor=#fefefe
| 468783 ||  || — || March 10, 2005 || Anderson Mesa || LONEOS || — || align=right data-sort-value="0.73" | 730 m || 
|-id=784 bgcolor=#fefefe
| 468784 ||  || — || October 17, 2007 || Mount Lemmon || Mount Lemmon Survey || — || align=right data-sort-value="0.84" | 840 m || 
|-id=785 bgcolor=#fefefe
| 468785 ||  || — || January 19, 2005 || Kitt Peak || Spacewatch || V || align=right data-sort-value="0.54" | 540 m || 
|-id=786 bgcolor=#C2FFFF
| 468786 ||  || — || January 18, 2012 || Mount Lemmon || Mount Lemmon Survey || L4 || align=right | 8.1 km || 
|-id=787 bgcolor=#fefefe
| 468787 ||  || — || March 13, 2005 || Mount Lemmon || Mount Lemmon Survey || — || align=right | 1.1 km || 
|-id=788 bgcolor=#fefefe
| 468788 ||  || — || August 19, 2006 || Kitt Peak || Spacewatch || — || align=right data-sort-value="0.74" | 740 m || 
|-id=789 bgcolor=#fefefe
| 468789 ||  || — || January 21, 2012 || Kitt Peak || Spacewatch || — || align=right data-sort-value="0.76" | 760 m || 
|-id=790 bgcolor=#fefefe
| 468790 ||  || — || November 3, 2007 || Kitt Peak || Spacewatch || — || align=right data-sort-value="0.65" | 650 m || 
|-id=791 bgcolor=#fefefe
| 468791 ||  || — || March 4, 2005 || Kitt Peak || Spacewatch || — || align=right data-sort-value="0.71" | 710 m || 
|-id=792 bgcolor=#fefefe
| 468792 ||  || — || May 11, 2005 || Mount Lemmon || Mount Lemmon Survey || — || align=right data-sort-value="0.76" | 760 m || 
|-id=793 bgcolor=#fefefe
| 468793 ||  || — || February 22, 2012 || Kitt Peak || Spacewatch || — || align=right data-sort-value="0.75" | 750 m || 
|-id=794 bgcolor=#fefefe
| 468794 ||  || — || January 13, 2008 || Kitt Peak || Spacewatch || MAS || align=right data-sort-value="0.67" | 670 m || 
|-id=795 bgcolor=#fefefe
| 468795 ||  || — || September 18, 2003 || Kitt Peak || Spacewatch || — || align=right data-sort-value="0.82" | 820 m || 
|-id=796 bgcolor=#fefefe
| 468796 ||  || — || January 10, 2008 || Mount Lemmon || Mount Lemmon Survey || — || align=right data-sort-value="0.78" | 780 m || 
|-id=797 bgcolor=#fefefe
| 468797 ||  || — || February 22, 2012 || Kitt Peak || Spacewatch || — || align=right data-sort-value="0.75" | 750 m || 
|-id=798 bgcolor=#fefefe
| 468798 ||  || — || June 11, 2005 || Kitt Peak || Spacewatch || — || align=right data-sort-value="0.95" | 950 m || 
|-id=799 bgcolor=#fefefe
| 468799 ||  || — || January 19, 2008 || Mount Lemmon || Mount Lemmon Survey || — || align=right data-sort-value="0.83" | 830 m || 
|-id=800 bgcolor=#E9E9E9
| 468800 ||  || — || April 17, 2012 || Kitt Peak || Spacewatch || — || align=right data-sort-value="0.89" | 890 m || 
|}

468801–468900 

|-bgcolor=#E9E9E9
| 468801 ||  || — || April 21, 2012 || Kitt Peak || Spacewatch || — || align=right | 2.2 km || 
|-id=802 bgcolor=#E9E9E9
| 468802 ||  || — || March 27, 2012 || Mount Lemmon || Mount Lemmon Survey || — || align=right | 1.1 km || 
|-id=803 bgcolor=#fefefe
| 468803 ||  || — || November 20, 2006 || Kitt Peak || Spacewatch || — || align=right data-sort-value="0.88" | 880 m || 
|-id=804 bgcolor=#FA8072
| 468804 ||  || — || March 29, 2008 || Kitt Peak || Spacewatch || — || align=right data-sort-value="0.96" | 960 m || 
|-id=805 bgcolor=#fefefe
| 468805 ||  || — || May 13, 2005 || Mount Lemmon || Mount Lemmon Survey || — || align=right data-sort-value="0.91" | 910 m || 
|-id=806 bgcolor=#fefefe
| 468806 ||  || — || December 18, 2007 || Mount Lemmon || Mount Lemmon Survey || — || align=right data-sort-value="0.84" | 840 m || 
|-id=807 bgcolor=#E9E9E9
| 468807 ||  || — || January 31, 2010 || WISE || WISE || — || align=right | 4.1 km || 
|-id=808 bgcolor=#fefefe
| 468808 ||  || — || March 29, 2012 || Kitt Peak || Spacewatch || — || align=right data-sort-value="0.90" | 900 m || 
|-id=809 bgcolor=#E9E9E9
| 468809 ||  || — || May 15, 2008 || Mount Lemmon || Mount Lemmon Survey || — || align=right | 1.8 km || 
|-id=810 bgcolor=#E9E9E9
| 468810 ||  || — || September 16, 2004 || Socorro || LINEAR || — || align=right | 1.6 km || 
|-id=811 bgcolor=#E9E9E9
| 468811 ||  || — || October 3, 2005 || Catalina || CSS || — || align=right | 1.5 km || 
|-id=812 bgcolor=#E9E9E9
| 468812 ||  || — || August 11, 2004 || Siding Spring || SSS || — || align=right | 1.8 km || 
|-id=813 bgcolor=#FFC2E0
| 468813 ||  || — || July 29, 2012 || Haleakala || Pan-STARRS || AMO || align=right data-sort-value="0.16" | 160 m || 
|-id=814 bgcolor=#E9E9E9
| 468814 ||  || — || February 23, 2007 || Mount Lemmon || Mount Lemmon Survey || — || align=right | 1.1 km || 
|-id=815 bgcolor=#E9E9E9
| 468815 ||  || — || July 20, 2012 || Siding Spring || SSS || — || align=right | 1.3 km || 
|-id=816 bgcolor=#E9E9E9
| 468816 ||  || — || October 23, 2008 || Kitt Peak || Spacewatch || — || align=right | 1.7 km || 
|-id=817 bgcolor=#d6d6d6
| 468817 ||  || — || May 8, 2010 || Mount Lemmon || Mount Lemmon Survey || — || align=right | 3.1 km || 
|-id=818 bgcolor=#E9E9E9
| 468818 ||  || — || November 3, 2008 || Kitt Peak || Spacewatch || — || align=right | 1.3 km || 
|-id=819 bgcolor=#d6d6d6
| 468819 ||  || — || September 14, 2007 || Mount Lemmon || Mount Lemmon Survey || — || align=right | 2.5 km || 
|-id=820 bgcolor=#E9E9E9
| 468820 ||  || — || October 6, 2008 || Mount Lemmon || Mount Lemmon Survey || — || align=right | 1.5 km || 
|-id=821 bgcolor=#FA8072
| 468821 ||  || — || December 14, 2004 || Catalina || CSS || — || align=right | 2.0 km || 
|-id=822 bgcolor=#E9E9E9
| 468822 ||  || — || April 30, 2006 || Kitt Peak || Spacewatch || — || align=right | 2.1 km || 
|-id=823 bgcolor=#E9E9E9
| 468823 ||  || — || April 21, 2006 || Catalina || CSS || — || align=right | 3.2 km || 
|-id=824 bgcolor=#E9E9E9
| 468824 ||  || — || August 8, 2007 || Socorro || LINEAR || — || align=right | 2.3 km || 
|-id=825 bgcolor=#E9E9E9
| 468825 ||  || — || September 15, 2012 || Catalina || CSS || — || align=right | 2.5 km || 
|-id=826 bgcolor=#FA8072
| 468826 ||  || — || December 13, 2004 || Kitt Peak || Spacewatch || — || align=right | 2.0 km || 
|-id=827 bgcolor=#E9E9E9
| 468827 ||  || — || August 24, 2007 || Kitt Peak || Spacewatch || — || align=right | 2.1 km || 
|-id=828 bgcolor=#d6d6d6
| 468828 ||  || — || September 17, 2012 || Kitt Peak || Spacewatch || EOS || align=right | 1.8 km || 
|-id=829 bgcolor=#E9E9E9
| 468829 ||  || — || September 16, 2012 || Kitt Peak || Spacewatch || — || align=right | 1.9 km || 
|-id=830 bgcolor=#E9E9E9
| 468830 ||  || — || November 7, 2008 || Mount Lemmon || Mount Lemmon Survey || GEF || align=right | 1.3 km || 
|-id=831 bgcolor=#E9E9E9
| 468831 ||  || — || November 3, 2008 || Mount Lemmon || Mount Lemmon Survey || — || align=right | 1.7 km || 
|-id=832 bgcolor=#d6d6d6
| 468832 ||  || — || January 1, 2009 || Kitt Peak || Spacewatch || EOS || align=right | 1.9 km || 
|-id=833 bgcolor=#d6d6d6
| 468833 ||  || — || November 18, 2007 || Mount Lemmon || Mount Lemmon Survey || — || align=right | 2.8 km || 
|-id=834 bgcolor=#E9E9E9
| 468834 ||  || — || April 24, 2010 || WISE || WISE || — || align=right | 3.9 km || 
|-id=835 bgcolor=#E9E9E9
| 468835 ||  || — || May 27, 2011 || Kitt Peak || Spacewatch || — || align=right | 2.1 km || 
|-id=836 bgcolor=#d6d6d6
| 468836 ||  || — || February 27, 2009 || Mount Lemmon || Mount Lemmon Survey || — || align=right | 2.5 km || 
|-id=837 bgcolor=#FFC2E0
| 468837 ||  || — || September 23, 2012 || Mount Lemmon || Mount Lemmon Survey || AMOcritical || align=right data-sort-value="0.22" | 220 m || 
|-id=838 bgcolor=#E9E9E9
| 468838 ||  || — || September 20, 2003 || Anderson Mesa || LONEOS || JUN || align=right | 1.0 km || 
|-id=839 bgcolor=#E9E9E9
| 468839 ||  || — || September 13, 2007 || Catalina || CSS || — || align=right | 2.2 km || 
|-id=840 bgcolor=#d6d6d6
| 468840 ||  || — || October 2, 2006 || Mount Lemmon || Mount Lemmon Survey || — || align=right | 2.8 km || 
|-id=841 bgcolor=#d6d6d6
| 468841 ||  || — || October 6, 2012 || Kitt Peak || Spacewatch || — || align=right | 2.9 km || 
|-id=842 bgcolor=#d6d6d6
| 468842 ||  || — || November 20, 2001 || Socorro || LINEAR || THM || align=right | 2.4 km || 
|-id=843 bgcolor=#fefefe
| 468843 ||  || — || March 9, 2011 || Catalina || CSS || H || align=right data-sort-value="0.82" | 820 m || 
|-id=844 bgcolor=#d6d6d6
| 468844 ||  || — || April 8, 2010 || Kitt Peak || Spacewatch || — || align=right | 2.4 km || 
|-id=845 bgcolor=#d6d6d6
| 468845 ||  || — || May 8, 2005 || Kitt Peak || Spacewatch || — || align=right | 2.4 km || 
|-id=846 bgcolor=#d6d6d6
| 468846 ||  || — || October 25, 2012 || Kitt Peak || Spacewatch || — || align=right | 3.5 km || 
|-id=847 bgcolor=#d6d6d6
| 468847 ||  || — || June 21, 2011 || Kitt Peak || Spacewatch || — || align=right | 3.1 km || 
|-id=848 bgcolor=#fefefe
| 468848 ||  || — || November 11, 2007 || Mount Lemmon || Mount Lemmon Survey || H || align=right data-sort-value="0.66" | 660 m || 
|-id=849 bgcolor=#d6d6d6
| 468849 ||  || — || February 2, 2008 || Catalina || CSS || — || align=right | 3.9 km || 
|-id=850 bgcolor=#fefefe
| 468850 ||  || — || April 27, 2003 || Anderson Mesa || LONEOS || H || align=right data-sort-value="0.73" | 730 m || 
|-id=851 bgcolor=#d6d6d6
| 468851 ||  || — || December 31, 2007 || Mount Lemmon || Mount Lemmon Survey || — || align=right | 3.2 km || 
|-id=852 bgcolor=#C2FFFF
| 468852 ||  || — || October 2, 2009 || Mount Lemmon || Mount Lemmon Survey || L4 || align=right | 12 km || 
|-id=853 bgcolor=#C2FFFF
| 468853 ||  || — || January 7, 2013 || Kitt Peak || Spacewatch || L4 || align=right | 7.8 km || 
|-id=854 bgcolor=#C2FFFF
| 468854 ||  || — || January 5, 2013 || Kitt Peak || Spacewatch || L4 || align=right | 6.3 km || 
|-id=855 bgcolor=#C2FFFF
| 468855 ||  || — || January 19, 2010 || WISE || WISE || L4 || align=right | 10 km || 
|-id=856 bgcolor=#C2FFFF
| 468856 ||  || — || October 30, 2010 || Kitt Peak || Spacewatch || L4 || align=right | 10 km || 
|-id=857 bgcolor=#fefefe
| 468857 ||  || — || February 16, 2013 || Catalina || CSS || H || align=right data-sort-value="0.62" | 620 m || 
|-id=858 bgcolor=#fefefe
| 468858 ||  || — || April 7, 2008 || Mount Lemmon || Mount Lemmon Survey || H || align=right data-sort-value="0.47" | 470 m || 
|-id=859 bgcolor=#fefefe
| 468859 ||  || — || April 11, 2005 || Mount Lemmon || Mount Lemmon Survey || H || align=right data-sort-value="0.67" | 670 m || 
|-id=860 bgcolor=#fefefe
| 468860 ||  || — || November 13, 2006 || Catalina || CSS || H || align=right data-sort-value="0.72" | 720 m || 
|-id=861 bgcolor=#C2E0FF
| 468861 ||  || — || June 8, 2013 || Mount Lemmon || Mount Lemmon Survey || centaurdamocloid || align=right | 90 km || 
|-id=862 bgcolor=#fefefe
| 468862 ||  || — || October 10, 2007 || Mount Lemmon || Mount Lemmon Survey || — || align=right data-sort-value="0.52" | 520 m || 
|-id=863 bgcolor=#fefefe
| 468863 ||  || — || September 2, 2010 || Mount Lemmon || Mount Lemmon Survey || — || align=right data-sort-value="0.60" | 600 m || 
|-id=864 bgcolor=#FA8072
| 468864 ||  || — || February 21, 2009 || Kitt Peak || Spacewatch || — || align=right data-sort-value="0.59" | 590 m || 
|-id=865 bgcolor=#fefefe
| 468865 ||  || — || November 17, 2006 || Kitt Peak || Spacewatch || — || align=right | 1.2 km || 
|-id=866 bgcolor=#fefefe
| 468866 ||  || — || October 19, 2010 || Mount Lemmon || Mount Lemmon Survey || — || align=right data-sort-value="0.73" | 730 m || 
|-id=867 bgcolor=#fefefe
| 468867 ||  || — || April 2, 2006 || Kitt Peak || Spacewatch || — || align=right data-sort-value="0.52" | 520 m || 
|-id=868 bgcolor=#fefefe
| 468868 ||  || — || July 21, 2006 || Mount Lemmon || Mount Lemmon Survey || V || align=right data-sort-value="0.58" | 580 m || 
|-id=869 bgcolor=#fefefe
| 468869 ||  || — || September 30, 2006 || Kitt Peak || Spacewatch || — || align=right data-sort-value="0.78" | 780 m || 
|-id=870 bgcolor=#fefefe
| 468870 ||  || — || October 29, 2003 || Kitt Peak || Spacewatch || BAP || align=right data-sort-value="0.69" | 690 m || 
|-id=871 bgcolor=#fefefe
| 468871 ||  || — || July 25, 2006 || Mount Lemmon || Mount Lemmon Survey || V || align=right data-sort-value="0.43" | 430 m || 
|-id=872 bgcolor=#fefefe
| 468872 ||  || — || September 27, 2003 || Kitt Peak || Spacewatch || — || align=right data-sort-value="0.59" | 590 m || 
|-id=873 bgcolor=#fefefe
| 468873 ||  || — || July 21, 2006 || Mount Lemmon || Mount Lemmon Survey || — || align=right data-sort-value="0.90" | 900 m || 
|-id=874 bgcolor=#fefefe
| 468874 ||  || — || November 3, 2010 || Mount Lemmon || Mount Lemmon Survey || — || align=right data-sort-value="0.68" | 680 m || 
|-id=875 bgcolor=#d6d6d6
| 468875 ||  || — || May 3, 2010 || WISE || WISE || — || align=right | 3.5 km || 
|-id=876 bgcolor=#E9E9E9
| 468876 ||  || — || November 9, 2009 || Socorro || LINEAR || — || align=right | 2.0 km || 
|-id=877 bgcolor=#fefefe
| 468877 ||  || — || September 27, 2006 || Mount Lemmon || Mount Lemmon Survey || — || align=right data-sort-value="0.61" | 610 m || 
|-id=878 bgcolor=#d6d6d6
| 468878 ||  || — || January 4, 2006 || Kitt Peak || Spacewatch || — || align=right | 3.6 km || 
|-id=879 bgcolor=#fefefe
| 468879 ||  || — || December 14, 2010 || Mount Lemmon || Mount Lemmon Survey || — || align=right | 1.2 km || 
|-id=880 bgcolor=#fefefe
| 468880 ||  || — || May 8, 2005 || Kitt Peak || Spacewatch || — || align=right data-sort-value="0.82" | 820 m || 
|-id=881 bgcolor=#fefefe
| 468881 ||  || — || April 2, 2006 || Kitt Peak || Spacewatch || — || align=right data-sort-value="0.62" | 620 m || 
|-id=882 bgcolor=#fefefe
| 468882 ||  || — || April 6, 2005 || Mount Lemmon || Mount Lemmon Survey || — || align=right data-sort-value="0.78" | 780 m || 
|-id=883 bgcolor=#fefefe
| 468883 ||  || — || September 26, 2006 || Kitt Peak || Spacewatch || — || align=right data-sort-value="0.70" | 700 m || 
|-id=884 bgcolor=#E9E9E9
| 468884 ||  || — || September 6, 1996 || Kitt Peak || Spacewatch || — || align=right | 1.0 km || 
|-id=885 bgcolor=#fefefe
| 468885 ||  || — || October 29, 2006 || Catalina || CSS || — || align=right | 1.2 km || 
|-id=886 bgcolor=#E9E9E9
| 468886 ||  || — || October 26, 2013 || Catalina || CSS || GEF || align=right | 1.3 km || 
|-id=887 bgcolor=#d6d6d6
| 468887 ||  || — || December 5, 2008 || Kitt Peak || Spacewatch || EOS || align=right | 1.9 km || 
|-id=888 bgcolor=#E9E9E9
| 468888 ||  || — || July 29, 2000 || Anderson Mesa || LONEOS || — || align=right | 1.0 km || 
|-id=889 bgcolor=#d6d6d6
| 468889 ||  || — || May 10, 2006 || Mount Lemmon || Mount Lemmon Survey || — || align=right | 4.1 km || 
|-id=890 bgcolor=#d6d6d6
| 468890 ||  || — || October 3, 2013 || Mount Lemmon || Mount Lemmon Survey || — || align=right | 3.4 km || 
|-id=891 bgcolor=#E9E9E9
| 468891 ||  || — || December 20, 2009 || Mount Lemmon || Mount Lemmon Survey || — || align=right | 2.5 km || 
|-id=892 bgcolor=#d6d6d6
| 468892 ||  || — || October 19, 2007 || Catalina || CSS || EOS || align=right | 1.9 km || 
|-id=893 bgcolor=#E9E9E9
| 468893 ||  || — || September 23, 2008 || Catalina || CSS || — || align=right | 2.7 km || 
|-id=894 bgcolor=#E9E9E9
| 468894 ||  || — || February 25, 2011 || Kitt Peak || Spacewatch || — || align=right data-sort-value="0.93" | 930 m || 
|-id=895 bgcolor=#d6d6d6
| 468895 ||  || — || November 12, 2013 || Mount Lemmon || Mount Lemmon Survey || — || align=right | 3.7 km || 
|-id=896 bgcolor=#d6d6d6
| 468896 ||  || — || January 18, 2009 || Kitt Peak || Spacewatch || EOS || align=right | 2.1 km || 
|-id=897 bgcolor=#d6d6d6
| 468897 ||  || — || March 20, 2010 || Mount Lemmon || Mount Lemmon Survey || — || align=right | 2.5 km || 
|-id=898 bgcolor=#E9E9E9
| 468898 ||  || — || October 21, 2008 || Kitt Peak || Spacewatch || — || align=right | 2.0 km || 
|-id=899 bgcolor=#d6d6d6
| 468899 ||  || — || June 5, 2005 || Kitt Peak || Spacewatch || — || align=right | 3.9 km || 
|-id=900 bgcolor=#d6d6d6
| 468900 ||  || — || July 14, 2010 || WISE || WISE || — || align=right | 3.5 km || 
|}

468901–469000 

|-bgcolor=#E9E9E9
| 468901 ||  || — || August 29, 2009 || Kitt Peak || Spacewatch || — || align=right | 4.3 km || 
|-id=902 bgcolor=#d6d6d6
| 468902 ||  || — || February 9, 2010 || WISE || WISE || — || align=right | 3.2 km || 
|-id=903 bgcolor=#E9E9E9
| 468903 ||  || — || November 27, 2009 || Mount Lemmon || Mount Lemmon Survey || — || align=right | 1.5 km || 
|-id=904 bgcolor=#E9E9E9
| 468904 ||  || — || November 26, 2009 || Mount Lemmon || Mount Lemmon Survey || — || align=right data-sort-value="0.94" | 940 m || 
|-id=905 bgcolor=#d6d6d6
| 468905 ||  || — || April 12, 2010 || WISE || WISE || — || align=right | 4.4 km || 
|-id=906 bgcolor=#d6d6d6
| 468906 ||  || — || September 16, 2006 || Catalina || CSS || — || align=right | 3.3 km || 
|-id=907 bgcolor=#d6d6d6
| 468907 ||  || — || August 16, 2012 || Siding Spring || SSS || THB || align=right | 3.4 km || 
|-id=908 bgcolor=#d6d6d6
| 468908 ||  || — || February 25, 2003 || Campo Imperatore || CINEOS || — || align=right | 3.8 km || 
|-id=909 bgcolor=#FFC2E0
| 468909 ||  || — || May 24, 2014 || Haleakala || Pan-STARRS || ATE || align=right data-sort-value="0.30" | 300 m || 
|-id=910 bgcolor=#FFC2E0
| 468910 ||  || — || May 26, 2014 || Haleakala || Pan-STARRS || APOPHA || align=right data-sort-value="0.16" | 160 m || 
|-id=911 bgcolor=#fefefe
| 468911 ||  || — || March 10, 2005 || Kitt Peak || Spacewatch || H || align=right data-sort-value="0.70" | 700 m || 
|-id=912 bgcolor=#fefefe
| 468912 ||  || — || September 17, 2006 || Catalina || CSS || H || align=right data-sort-value="0.71" | 710 m || 
|-id=913 bgcolor=#fefefe
| 468913 ||  || — || September 26, 2006 || Kitt Peak || Spacewatch || H || align=right data-sort-value="0.68" | 680 m || 
|-id=914 bgcolor=#E9E9E9
| 468914 ||  || — || October 5, 2014 || Mount Lemmon || Mount Lemmon Survey || — || align=right | 1.2 km || 
|-id=915 bgcolor=#E9E9E9
| 468915 ||  || — || October 27, 2005 || Mount Lemmon || Mount Lemmon Survey || — || align=right | 2.9 km || 
|-id=916 bgcolor=#fefefe
| 468916 ||  || — || January 6, 2005 || Socorro || LINEAR || H || align=right data-sort-value="0.98" | 980 m || 
|-id=917 bgcolor=#FA8072
| 468917 ||  || — || August 23, 2001 || Kitt Peak || Spacewatch || — || align=right | 1.7 km || 
|-id=918 bgcolor=#E9E9E9
| 468918 ||  || — || December 20, 2001 || Kitt Peak || Spacewatch || — || align=right | 3.2 km || 
|-id=919 bgcolor=#fefefe
| 468919 ||  || — || September 16, 2006 || Catalina || CSS || H || align=right data-sort-value="0.59" | 590 m || 
|-id=920 bgcolor=#fefefe
| 468920 ||  || — || November 22, 2006 || Kitt Peak || Spacewatch || H || align=right data-sort-value="0.62" | 620 m || 
|-id=921 bgcolor=#d6d6d6
| 468921 ||  || — || November 21, 2003 || Kitt Peak || Spacewatch || — || align=right | 3.2 km || 
|-id=922 bgcolor=#d6d6d6
| 468922 ||  || — || January 22, 2004 || Socorro || LINEAR || THB || align=right | 3.1 km || 
|-id=923 bgcolor=#fefefe
| 468923 ||  || — || February 2, 2005 || Socorro || LINEAR || H || align=right data-sort-value="0.76" | 760 m || 
|-id=924 bgcolor=#E9E9E9
| 468924 ||  || — || March 28, 2011 || Mount Lemmon || Mount Lemmon Survey || GEF || align=right | 1.2 km || 
|-id=925 bgcolor=#E9E9E9
| 468925 ||  || — || December 25, 2000 || Kitt Peak || Spacewatch || — || align=right | 2.8 km || 
|-id=926 bgcolor=#d6d6d6
| 468926 ||  || — || March 19, 2010 || WISE || WISE || 7:4 || align=right | 3.6 km || 
|-id=927 bgcolor=#d6d6d6
| 468927 ||  || — || December 23, 2001 || Kitt Peak || Spacewatch || 7:4 || align=right | 4.7 km || 
|-id=928 bgcolor=#d6d6d6
| 468928 ||  || — || June 15, 2010 || WISE || WISE || — || align=right | 4.1 km || 
|-id=929 bgcolor=#d6d6d6
| 468929 ||  || — || March 18, 2010 || Catalina || CSS || Tj (2.93) || align=right | 4.9 km || 
|-id=930 bgcolor=#d6d6d6
| 468930 ||  || — || September 20, 2008 || Mount Lemmon || Mount Lemmon Survey || — || align=right | 2.8 km || 
|-id=931 bgcolor=#E9E9E9
| 468931 ||  || — || March 25, 2007 || Mount Lemmon || Mount Lemmon Survey || — || align=right | 1.4 km || 
|-id=932 bgcolor=#E9E9E9
| 468932 ||  || — || December 11, 2010 || Mount Lemmon || Mount Lemmon Survey || EUN || align=right | 1.1 km || 
|-id=933 bgcolor=#d6d6d6
| 468933 ||  || — || June 21, 2010 || WISE || WISE || — || align=right | 3.9 km || 
|-id=934 bgcolor=#d6d6d6
| 468934 ||  || — || January 16, 2005 || Kitt Peak || Spacewatch || — || align=right | 2.4 km || 
|-id=935 bgcolor=#d6d6d6
| 468935 ||  || — || May 19, 2010 || WISE || WISE || — || align=right | 2.8 km || 
|-id=936 bgcolor=#E9E9E9
| 468936 ||  || — || October 11, 2005 || Kitt Peak || Spacewatch || — || align=right | 1.2 km || 
|-id=937 bgcolor=#d6d6d6
| 468937 ||  || — || March 3, 2005 || Kitt Peak || Spacewatch || — || align=right | 4.0 km || 
|-id=938 bgcolor=#d6d6d6
| 468938 ||  || — || September 9, 2007 || Kitt Peak || Spacewatch || — || align=right | 3.7 km || 
|-id=939 bgcolor=#d6d6d6
| 468939 ||  || — || September 20, 2001 || Socorro || LINEAR || — || align=right | 3.2 km || 
|-id=940 bgcolor=#d6d6d6
| 468940 ||  || — || September 4, 2013 || Mount Lemmon || Mount Lemmon Survey || — || align=right | 2.6 km || 
|-id=941 bgcolor=#d6d6d6
| 468941 ||  || — || May 8, 2010 || WISE || WISE || — || align=right | 2.8 km || 
|-id=942 bgcolor=#E9E9E9
| 468942 ||  || — || March 15, 2007 || Mount Lemmon || Mount Lemmon Survey || MAR || align=right | 1.2 km || 
|-id=943 bgcolor=#d6d6d6
| 468943 ||  || — || June 14, 2010 || WISE || WISE || — || align=right | 3.2 km || 
|-id=944 bgcolor=#E9E9E9
| 468944 ||  || — || November 28, 2005 || Kitt Peak || Spacewatch || — || align=right | 2.1 km || 
|-id=945 bgcolor=#d6d6d6
| 468945 ||  || — || January 12, 2010 || WISE || WISE || — || align=right | 3.6 km || 
|-id=946 bgcolor=#fefefe
| 468946 ||  || — || October 11, 1996 || Kitt Peak || Spacewatch || — || align=right data-sort-value="0.90" | 900 m || 
|-id=947 bgcolor=#E9E9E9
| 468947 ||  || — || September 28, 2009 || Mount Lemmon || Mount Lemmon Survey || WIT || align=right | 1.1 km || 
|-id=948 bgcolor=#fefefe
| 468948 ||  || — || October 11, 2007 || Catalina || CSS || — || align=right data-sort-value="0.80" | 800 m || 
|-id=949 bgcolor=#fefefe
| 468949 ||  || — || November 8, 2007 || Mount Lemmon || Mount Lemmon Survey || — || align=right | 1.1 km || 
|-id=950 bgcolor=#E9E9E9
| 468950 ||  || — || March 13, 2007 || Kitt Peak || Spacewatch || — || align=right | 1.5 km || 
|-id=951 bgcolor=#d6d6d6
| 468951 ||  || — || June 22, 2010 || WISE || WISE || — || align=right | 3.0 km || 
|-id=952 bgcolor=#d6d6d6
| 468952 ||  || — || December 18, 2004 || Mount Lemmon || Mount Lemmon Survey || — || align=right | 2.3 km || 
|-id=953 bgcolor=#E9E9E9
| 468953 ||  || — || January 22, 1998 || Kitt Peak || Spacewatch || — || align=right | 1.1 km || 
|-id=954 bgcolor=#d6d6d6
| 468954 ||  || — || February 18, 2010 || Mount Lemmon || Mount Lemmon Survey || THM || align=right | 2.3 km || 
|-id=955 bgcolor=#E9E9E9
| 468955 ||  || — || January 25, 2006 || Kitt Peak || Spacewatch || HOF || align=right | 2.8 km || 
|-id=956 bgcolor=#d6d6d6
| 468956 ||  || — || December 18, 2009 || Kitt Peak || Spacewatch || — || align=right | 2.9 km || 
|-id=957 bgcolor=#E9E9E9
| 468957 ||  || — || January 5, 2006 || Mount Lemmon || Mount Lemmon Survey || GEF || align=right | 1.2 km || 
|-id=958 bgcolor=#fefefe
| 468958 ||  || — || February 7, 2000 || Kitt Peak || Spacewatch || — || align=right data-sort-value="0.98" | 980 m || 
|-id=959 bgcolor=#d6d6d6
| 468959 ||  || — || September 3, 2008 || Kitt Peak || Spacewatch || — || align=right | 2.4 km || 
|-id=960 bgcolor=#fefefe
| 468960 ||  || — || May 14, 2009 || Kitt Peak || Spacewatch || — || align=right data-sort-value="0.78" | 780 m || 
|-id=961 bgcolor=#d6d6d6
| 468961 ||  || — || September 22, 2008 || Kitt Peak || Spacewatch || — || align=right | 2.5 km || 
|-id=962 bgcolor=#d6d6d6
| 468962 ||  || — || December 22, 2003 || Kitt Peak || Spacewatch || — || align=right | 3.2 km || 
|-id=963 bgcolor=#d6d6d6
| 468963 ||  || — || February 2, 2005 || Kitt Peak || Spacewatch || — || align=right | 2.5 km || 
|-id=964 bgcolor=#E9E9E9
| 468964 ||  || — || December 18, 2001 || Socorro || LINEAR || — || align=right | 1.5 km || 
|-id=965 bgcolor=#d6d6d6
| 468965 ||  || — || February 14, 2010 || Catalina || CSS || — || align=right | 2.9 km || 
|-id=966 bgcolor=#fefefe
| 468966 ||  || — || May 24, 2010 || WISE || WISE || — || align=right | 2.2 km || 
|-id=967 bgcolor=#fefefe
| 468967 ||  || — || February 1, 2012 || Kitt Peak || Spacewatch || — || align=right | 1.0 km || 
|-id=968 bgcolor=#fefefe
| 468968 ||  || — || November 19, 2003 || Catalina || CSS || — || align=right | 1.1 km || 
|-id=969 bgcolor=#fefefe
| 468969 ||  || — || November 3, 2007 || Mount Lemmon || Mount Lemmon Survey || — || align=right data-sort-value="0.78" | 780 m || 
|-id=970 bgcolor=#d6d6d6
| 468970 ||  || — || October 2, 2013 || Mount Lemmon || Mount Lemmon Survey || — || align=right | 2.9 km || 
|-id=971 bgcolor=#d6d6d6
| 468971 ||  || — || May 24, 2010 || WISE || WISE || — || align=right | 2.2 km || 
|-id=972 bgcolor=#fefefe
| 468972 ||  || — || October 28, 2006 || Mount Lemmon || Mount Lemmon Survey || MAS || align=right data-sort-value="0.71" | 710 m || 
|-id=973 bgcolor=#E9E9E9
| 468973 ||  || — || September 9, 2008 || Mount Lemmon || Mount Lemmon Survey || — || align=right | 2.6 km || 
|-id=974 bgcolor=#d6d6d6
| 468974 ||  || — || October 9, 2008 || Catalina || CSS || — || align=right | 3.0 km || 
|-id=975 bgcolor=#d6d6d6
| 468975 ||  || — || February 9, 2010 || Kitt Peak || Spacewatch || — || align=right | 2.1 km || 
|-id=976 bgcolor=#fefefe
| 468976 ||  || — || December 31, 2007 || Mount Lemmon || Mount Lemmon Survey || — || align=right data-sort-value="0.99" | 990 m || 
|-id=977 bgcolor=#E9E9E9
| 468977 ||  || — || January 9, 2002 || Socorro || LINEAR || — || align=right | 1.6 km || 
|-id=978 bgcolor=#d6d6d6
| 468978 ||  || — || February 13, 2004 || Kitt Peak || Spacewatch || VER || align=right | 2.6 km || 
|-id=979 bgcolor=#d6d6d6
| 468979 ||  || — || May 6, 2011 || Kitt Peak || Spacewatch || EOS || align=right | 2.0 km || 
|-id=980 bgcolor=#d6d6d6
| 468980 ||  || — || February 25, 2006 || Kitt Peak || Spacewatch || — || align=right | 1.9 km || 
|-id=981 bgcolor=#fefefe
| 468981 ||  || — || April 4, 2008 || Catalina || CSS || — || align=right | 1.2 km || 
|-id=982 bgcolor=#fefefe
| 468982 ||  || — || April 10, 2005 || Mount Lemmon || Mount Lemmon Survey || — || align=right data-sort-value="0.54" | 540 m || 
|-id=983 bgcolor=#d6d6d6
| 468983 ||  || — || May 8, 2010 || WISE || WISE || — || align=right | 3.2 km || 
|-id=984 bgcolor=#E9E9E9
| 468984 ||  || — || December 6, 2005 || Kitt Peak || Spacewatch || — || align=right | 1.3 km || 
|-id=985 bgcolor=#d6d6d6
| 468985 ||  || — || February 27, 2006 || Kitt Peak || Spacewatch || KOR || align=right | 1.3 km || 
|-id=986 bgcolor=#d6d6d6
| 468986 ||  || — || November 17, 2008 || Kitt Peak || Spacewatch || — || align=right | 1.7 km || 
|-id=987 bgcolor=#d6d6d6
| 468987 ||  || — || October 15, 2007 || Kitt Peak || Spacewatch || HYG || align=right | 2.8 km || 
|-id=988 bgcolor=#d6d6d6
| 468988 ||  || — || January 7, 2005 || Kitt Peak || Spacewatch || KOR || align=right | 1.5 km || 
|-id=989 bgcolor=#E9E9E9
| 468989 ||  || — || December 14, 2010 || Mount Lemmon || Mount Lemmon Survey || — || align=right | 1.1 km || 
|-id=990 bgcolor=#E9E9E9
| 468990 ||  || — || January 28, 2006 || Kitt Peak || Spacewatch || — || align=right | 2.5 km || 
|-id=991 bgcolor=#E9E9E9
| 468991 ||  || — || March 16, 2007 || Mount Lemmon || Mount Lemmon Survey || — || align=right | 1.0 km || 
|-id=992 bgcolor=#fefefe
| 468992 ||  || — || June 13, 2005 || Kitt Peak || Spacewatch || — || align=right data-sort-value="0.87" | 870 m || 
|-id=993 bgcolor=#d6d6d6
| 468993 ||  || — || October 26, 2008 || Kitt Peak || Spacewatch || EOS || align=right | 1.7 km || 
|-id=994 bgcolor=#E9E9E9
| 468994 ||  || — || March 9, 2011 || Kitt Peak || Spacewatch || — || align=right | 2.2 km || 
|-id=995 bgcolor=#d6d6d6
| 468995 ||  || — || September 24, 2008 || Mount Lemmon || Mount Lemmon Survey || KOR || align=right | 1.1 km || 
|-id=996 bgcolor=#d6d6d6
| 468996 ||  || — || December 17, 2003 || Kitt Peak || Spacewatch || EOS || align=right | 2.4 km || 
|-id=997 bgcolor=#E9E9E9
| 468997 ||  || — || February 21, 2006 || Mount Lemmon || Mount Lemmon Survey || MRX || align=right | 1.1 km || 
|-id=998 bgcolor=#fefefe
| 468998 ||  || — || November 24, 2006 || Mount Lemmon || Mount Lemmon Survey || — || align=right | 1.2 km || 
|-id=999 bgcolor=#fefefe
| 468999 ||  || — || December 31, 2007 || Mount Lemmon || Mount Lemmon Survey || V || align=right data-sort-value="0.50" | 500 m || 
|-id=000 bgcolor=#E9E9E9
| 469000 ||  || — || October 29, 1999 || Kitt Peak || Spacewatch || — || align=right | 2.0 km || 
|}

References

External links 
 Discovery Circumstances: Numbered Minor Planets (465001)–(470000) (IAU Minor Planet Center)

0468